= Advaita Vedanta =

Hindu tradition of textual interpretation

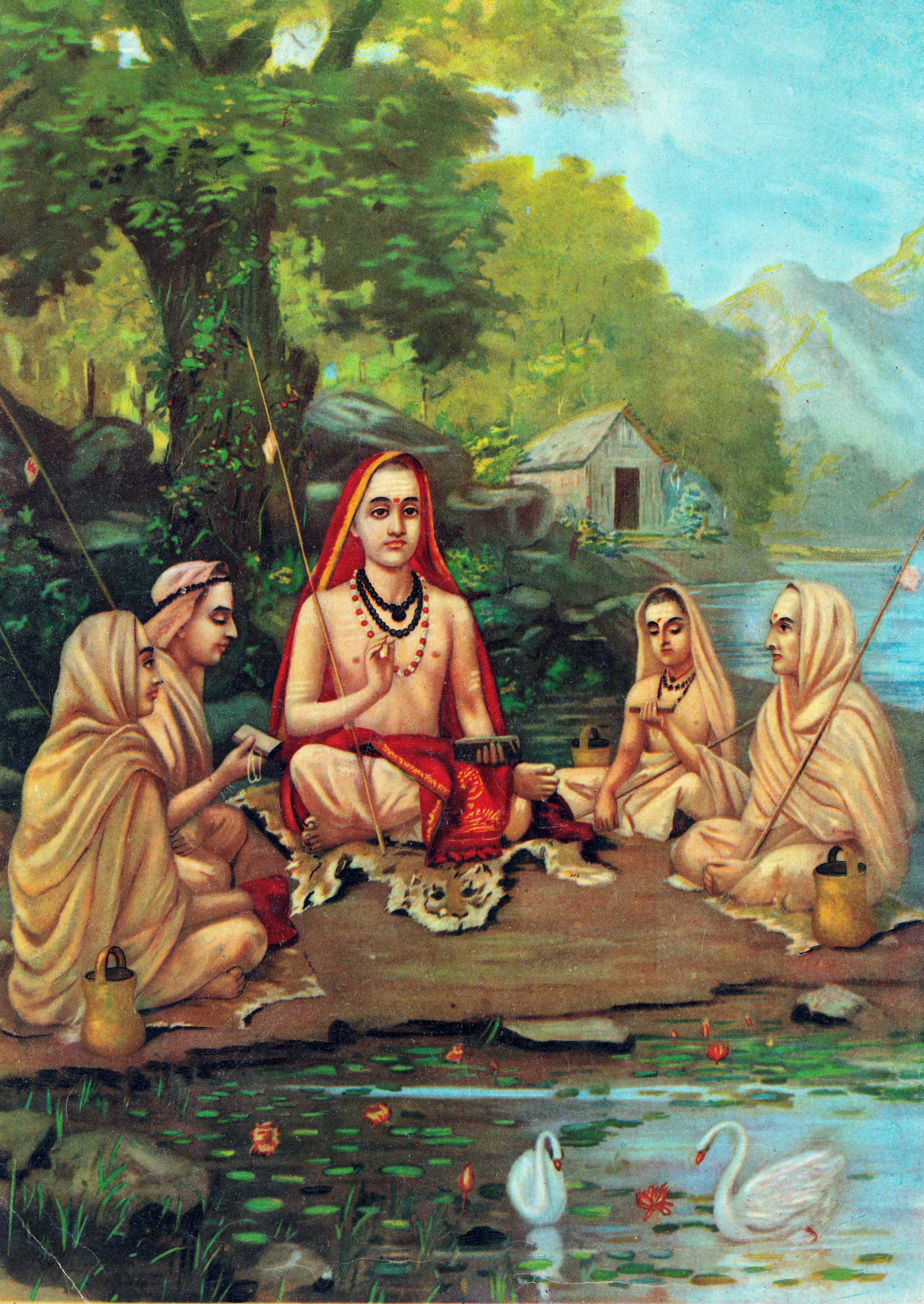
Adi Shankara, the most prominent exponent of Advaita Vedānta tradition. "I am other than name, form and action. My nature is ever free! I am Self, the supreme unconditioned Brahman. I am pure Awareness, always non-dual." Adi Shankara, Upadesasahasri 11.7

Advaita Vedanta (/ʌdˈvaɪtə vɛˈdɑːntə/; Sanskrit: अद्वैतवेदान्तः, IAST: Advaita Vedānta) is a Hindu tradition of Vedanta, a Brahmanical tradition of textual exegesis and philosophy; and a monastic institutional tradition nominally related to the Daśanāmi Sampradaya and propagated by the Smarta tradition. Its core tenet is that jivatman, the individual experiencing self, is ultimately pure awareness mistakenly identified with the body and its senses and with thought-constructs, and non-different from Ātman-Brahman or sat, the highest Self or Real. (Note: Highest self: Shankara, Upadesasahasri I.18.3: "I am ever-free, the existent" (Sat). I.18.6: "The two [contradictory] notions "I am the Existent-Brahman" and "I act," have Atman as their witness. It is considered more reasonable to give up only [that one] of the two [notions] which arises from ignorance. I.18.7: "The notion, "I am the Existent," arises from right means of knowledge [while] the other notion has its origin in fallacious means of knowledge." (Mayeda 1992, p. 172); Brahmajnanavalimala Verse 20: "Brahman is real, the universe is mithya (it cannot be categorized as either real or unreal). The jiva is Brahman itself and not different." Translation by S. N. Sastri; Sivananda 1993, p. 219: "Brahman (the Absolute) is alone real; this world is unreal; and the Jiva or individual soul is non-different from Brahman."; Menon 2012: "The experiencing self (jīva) and the transcendental self of the Universe (ātman) are in reality identical (both are Brahman), though the individual self seems different as space within a container seems different from space as such. These cardinal doctrines are represented in the anonymous verse "brahma satyam jagan mithya; jīvo brahmaiva na aparah" (Brahman is alone True, and this world of plurality is an error; the individual self is not different from Brahman)."; Deutsch 1973, p. 54: "[the] essential status [of the individual human person] is that of unqualified reality, of identity with the Absolute [...] the self (jiva) is only misperceived: the self is really Brahman."; Koller 2013, pp. 100–101: "Atman, which is identical to Brahman, is ultimately the only reality and [...] the appearance of plurality is entirely the work of ignorance [...] the self is ultimately of the nature of Atman-Brahman [...] Brahman alone is ultimately real."; Bowker 2000a, "Advaita Vedanta": "There is only Brahman, which is necessarily undifferentiated. It follows that there cannot even be a difference, or duality, between the human subject, or self, and Brahman, for Brahman must be that very self (since Brahman is the reality underlying all appearance). The goal of human life and wisdom must, therefore, be the realization that the self (ātman) is Brahman."; Hacker (1995, p. 88) notes that Shankara uses two groups of words to denote 'atman': "One group – principally jiva, vijnanatman, and sarira – expresses the illusory aspect of the soul [...] But in addition there are the two expressions atman and pratyagatman. These also designate the individual soul, but in its real aspect." Mayeda (1992, pp. 11, 14) uses the word pratyagatman; Sivananda1993, p. 219), Deutsch (1973, p. 54), and Menon (2012) use the term jiva when referring to the identity of atman and Brahman.) The term Advaita (अद्वैत) literally means "not-two" or "one without a second", which means that only Brahman, 'the one', is ultimately real while prapanca, 'the second', 'the world' or the multiplicity of thought-constructs, is not fully real. It is commonly rendered as "nonduality", and popularly interpreted as meaning that Atman is non-different from Brahman, and often equated with monism. (Note: Form of monism: Malkovsky 2000, p. 71: "The interpretation of advaita that is the most common equates non-duality with monism and acosmic illusionism. Only the Absolute, or the paraa brahma, is said to exist; everything else is but an illusory appearance."; Menon 2012: "The essential philosophy of Advaita is an idealist monism, and is considered to be presented first in the Upaniṣads and consolidated in the Brahma Sūtra by this tradition."; King 1995, p. 65: "The prevailing monism of the Upanishads was developed by the Advaita Vedanta to its ultimate extreme."; Mohanty 1980, p. 205: "Nyaya-Vaiseshika is realistic; Advaita Vedanta is idealistic. The former is pluralistic, the latter monistic.")

Advaita Vedanta is a Hindu sādhanā, a path of spiritual discipline and experience. (Note: Philosophy and spiritual experience: Deutsch 1988, p. 4: "Advaita Vedanta is more than a philosophical system, as we understand these terms in the West today; it is also a practical guide to spiritual experience and is intimately bound up with spiritual experience."; Puligandla 1997, p. 11: "Any philosophy worthy of its title should not be a mere intellectual exercise but should have practical application in enabling man to live an enlightened life. A philosophy which makes no difference to the quality and style of our life is no philosophy, but an empty intellectual construction.") It states that moksha ('liberation', freedom) is attained when knowledge of Brahman is attained, recognising the illusoriness of the phenomenal world and disidentifying from body-mind and the notion of 'doership', (Note: According to Shankara, in Adhyasa-bhasya (pre-amble to Brahma Sutra Bhashya I.1.1), it is self-evident that Ātman, pure awareness or the witness-consciousness, is completely different from non-Atman, the thinking and acting self and the material world.) acquiring vidyā (knowledge) of one's true identity as Atman-Brahman, self-luminous (svayam prakāśa) (Note: Self-luminosity; see Deutsch 1973, p. 48; Dasgupta 1975, pp. 148–149; Indich 2000, pp. 24, 28; Menon 2012; Ganeri 2019, p. 103; Murti 1983, p. 339; Isaeva 1993, p. 102. For the translation and meaning of svayam prakāśa: svayam: "himself, autonomous, in person" (Sanskrit Dictionary for Spoken Sanskrit, svayam Archived 7 December 2021 at the Wayback Machine); prakāśa: "manifestation," literally "light" or "illumination"; "the capacity to disclose, present, or make manifest" (Fasching 2021 note 1, referring to "MacKenzie 2017, 335; cf. also Ram-Prasad 2007, 53"); Svayam prakāśa can be translated as: "self-luminous" (Ganeri 2019; Menon 2012); "self-revealing" (Dasgupta 1975)); "self-manifesting" (Chatterjea 2003, p. 1); "Self-aware" (Wood 1992, p. 102); "Immediate" (Murti 1983, p. 339); On the meaning of svayam prakāśa: Menezes 2017, p. 198: "Self-luminosity (svayam prakāśa) means self is pure awareness by nature"; idem Ganeri 2019: "self is pure awareness by nature."; Murti 1983, p. 339: "a foundational consciousness [...] to which everything is presented, but is itself no presentation, that which knows all, but is itself no object."; For a detailed treatment, see Mackenzie 2012; Fasching 2011.) awareness or Witness-consciousness. (Note: For pure Consciousness, also included in the phrase sat-cit-ananda, see Mayeda 1992, p. 103 (verse 1), p. 105 (note 1); p. 126, verse 7; Deutsch 1973, pp. 48–51; Davis 2010, pp. 34–35; Rambachan 2006, pp. 7, 99–103; Menon 2012; Fasching 2021; Sinha 2016, p. 42.: Shankara, Upadeśasāhasrī I.1.1, translated in Mayeda 1992, p. 103: "Salutation to the all-knowing Pure Consciousness [note 1] which pervades all, is all, abides in the hearts of all beings, and is beyond all objects [of knowledge]. [Note 1 by Mayeda: "The Sanskrit term caitanya translated here as "Pure Consciousness" is used as a synonym for Brahman-Atman, indicating the nature of It."]; Shankara, Upadeśasāhasrī I.11.7, translated in Mayeda 1992, p. 126: "Being different from name, form, and action and by nature constantly free, I am Atman, ie. the highest Brahman; I am Pure Consciousness only and always non-dual."; Deutsch 1973, p. 48: "Atman (or paramatman, the highest Self), for Advaita vedanta, is that pure, undifferentiated, self-shining consciousness, timeless, spaceless, and unthinkable, that is non-different from Brahman and that underlies and supports the individual human person."; Menon 2012: "For classical Advaita Vedānta, Brahman is the fundamental reality underlying all objects and experiences. Brahman is explained as pure existence, pure consciousness and pure bliss. All forms of existence presuppose a knowing self. Brahman or pure consciousness underlies the knowing self. Consciousness according to the Advaita School, unlike the positions held by other Vedānta schools, is not a property of Brahman but its very nature. Brahman is also one without a second, all-pervading and the immediate awareness."; Fasching 2021: "According to Advaita Vedānta, the absolute is pure, qualityless and unchanging consciousness. Our consciousness (the consciousness of individual conscious entities) is not distinct from it, but is nothing other than this absolute itself, (seemingly) modified by the mental states of respective individual minds."; Sinha 2016, p. 42: "According to the Advaita Vedānta, the Atman is pure, eternal, undifferenced consciousness, while the jīva is the pure consciousness limited or determined by the internal organ (antahkarana).") This knowledge is revealed through Upanishadic statements such as tat tvam asi, "that['s how] you are", which destroy the ignorance (avidyā) regarding one's true identity by revealing that (jiv)Ātman is non-different from immortal (Note: Potter (2008, p. 136); see Brihadaranyaka Upanishad 2.51-14; Chandogya Upanishad 8.3.4.) Brahman.

The Advaita vedanta tradition modifies the Samkhya-dualism between Purusha (pure awareness or consciousness) and Prakriti ('nature', which includes matter but also cognition and emotion) as the two equal basic principles of existence. It proposes instead that Atman-Brahman (awareness, purusha) alone is ultimately real and, though unchanging, is the cause and origin of the transient phenomenal world (prakriti). In this view, the jivatman or individual self is a mere reflection or limitation of singular Ātman in a multitude of apparent individual bodies. It regards the material world as an illusory appearance (maya) or "an unreal manifestation (vivarta) of Brahman", the latter as proposed by the 13th-century scholar Prakasatman of the Vivarana school.

Advaita Vedanta is often presented as an elite scholarly tradition belonging to the orthodox Hindu Vedānta (Note: Literally: end or the goal of the Vedas, referring to the Upanishads and their interpretation; it is a tradition of interpretation of the Upanishads,(Nakamura 1990, p. 112) the Brahma Sutras, and the Bhagavad Gitā.(Grimes 1990, pp. 6–7, Menon 2012)) tradition, emphasising scholarly works written in Sanskrit; as such, it is an "iconic representation of Hindu religion and culture." Yet contemporary Advaita Vedanta is yogic Advaita, a medieval and modern syncretic tradition incorporating Yoga and other traditions, and producing works in vernacular. The earliest Advaita writings are the Sannyasa Upanishads (first centuries CE), the Vākyapadīya, written by Bhartṛhari (second half 5th century,) and the Māndūkya-kārikā written by Gauḍapāda (7th century). Gaudapada adapted philosophical concepts from Buddhism, giving them a Vedantic basis and interpretation. The Buddhist concepts were further Vedanticised by Adi Shankara (8th c. CE), who is generally regarded as the most prominent exponent of the Advaita Vedānta tradition, though some of the most prominent Advaita-propositions come from other Advaitins, and his early influence has been questioned. (Note: King 2002, p. 128: "Although it is common to find Western scholars and Hindus arguing that Sankaracarya was the most influential and important figure in the history of Hindu intellectual thought, this does not seem to be justified by the historical evidence." Critical scholarship has identified a number of key concepts used in contemporary Advaita Vedānta which differ from Shankara's views, revealing a discrepancy between the nominal adherence to Shankara and the actual alliance with his views.(Suthren Hirst 2005, p. 4, Potter 2006, pp. 6–7) Some modern Advaitins, specifically Satchidanandendra Sarasvati, argue that most of post-Shankara Advaita Vedanta actually deviates from Shankara, an argument deemed correct by Potter.(Potter 2006, pp. 6–7, Roodurmun 2002, pp. 33–34) Potter (2006, pp. 6–7): "...these modern interpreters are implying that most Advaitins after Samkara's time are confused and basically mistaken, and that 99% of the extant classical interpretive literature on Samkara's philosophy is off the mark. This is clearly a remarkably radical conclusion. Yet, there is good reason to think that it may well be true." Satchidanandendra Sarasvati 1997, p. 6: "almost all the later Advaitins were influenced by Mandana Misra and Bhaskara.") Adi Shankara emphasized that, since Brahman is ever-present, Brahman-knowledge is immediate and requires no 'action' or 'doership', that is, striving (to attain) and effort. Nevertheless, the Advaita tradition, as represented by Mandana Misra and the Bhamati school, also prescribes elaborate preparatory practice, including contemplation of mahavakyas, presenting a tension between sudden and gradual approaches which is also recognized in other spiritual disciplines and traditions. (Note: Compare, in Buddhism: Subitism, Hongaku ("original enlightenment"), Post-satori practice. See also Nisargadatta Maharaj on 'the bird's way and the ant's way'.)

Shankaracharya's prominence as the exemplary defender of traditional Hindu-values and spirituality started to take shape only centuries later, in the 14th century, with the ascent of Sringeri matha and its jagadguru Vidyaranya (Madhava, 14th cent.) in the Vijayanagara Empire, (Note: Sringeri matha received patronage from the kings of the Vijayanagara Empire,(Goodding 2013, p. 89) competing with Srivaisnava Visistadvaita groups for royal patronage and converts.(Stoker 2016, pp. 55–56) The works of the influential Advaitin Vidyaranya (Madhava, 14th cent.), jagadguru of Sringeri matha from ca. 1374–1380 to 1386, presented Advaita teachings as the summit of the Indian darśanam,(Hacker 1995, pp. 29–30, Blake Michael 1992, pp. 60–62 with notes 6, 7, and 8, King 2002, p. 128, Roodurmun 2002, pp. 33–34) while the subsequent Shankara Digvijayam genre deified him as a ruler-renunciate who conquered the four quarters.(Nowicka 2016, p. 147, Bader 2001, p. vii) Shankara's prominence was further established in the 19th and 20th century, gaining worldwide fame, in a "confluence of interests" of Western Christian missionaries, the British Raj, and Indian nationalists.(King 2002, pp. 129–135)) While Adi Shankara did not embrace Yoga, the Advaita-tradition by then had accepted yogic samadhi as a means to still the mind and attain knowledge, explicitly incorporating elements from the yogic tradition and texts like the Yoga Vasistha and the Bhagavata Purana, culminating in Swami Vivekananda's full embrace and propagation of Yogic samadhi as an Advaita means of knowledge and liberation. In the 19th century, due to the influence of Vidyaranya's Sarvadarśanasaṅgraha, the importance of Advaita Vedānta was overemphasized by Western scholarship, and Advaita Vedānta came to be regarded as the paradigmatic example of Hindu spirituality, despite the numerical dominance of theistic Bhakti-oriented religiosity. In modern times, Advaita views appear in various Neo-Vedānta movements.

== Etymology and nomenclature ==
=== Etymology ===
The word Advaita is a composite of two Sanskrit words:

- Prefix "a-" (अ), meaning "non-"
- "Dvaita" (द्वैत), which means 'duality' or 'dualism'. (Note: Britannica, The Editors of Encyclopaedia. "Dvaita". Encyclopedia Britannica, 19 Feb. 2015, https://www.britannica.com/topic/Dvaita Archived 9 March 2021 at the Wayback Machine. Accessed 13 March 2022.)

Advaita is often translated as "non-duality", but a more apt translation is "non-secondness". Fabian Volker, following Paul Hacker explains that dvaita does not mean "duality", but "the state in which a second is present", synonymous with prapanca, "conceptual proliferation", and with jagat, "the world". Advaita thus means that only Brahman, 'the one', is ultimately real, while the world with its multiplicity, 'the second', is not fully real. As Gaudapada states, when the unreal is taken as real, people grasp to the unreal, which is samsara. By realizing one's true identity as Brahman, there is no more grasping, and the mind comes to rest.

In a popular sense, advaita is often expressed as the famous diction that Atman is Brahman, meaning that jivatman, the individual experiencing self, is ultimately pure awareness mistakenly identified with body and the senses, and non-different ("na aparah") from Ātman/Brahman, the highest Self or Reality;; the knowledge of this true identity is liberating.

The word Vedānta is a composition of two Sanskrit words: The word Veda refers to the whole corpus of vedic texts, and the word "anta" means 'end'. From this, one meaning of Vedānta is "the end of the Vedas" or "the ultimate knowledge of the Vedas". As all the vedas are divided into four parts i.e. Samhita, Brahmana, Aranyaka and Upanishads, Upanishads are the ultimate and final part of vedas, Vedanta is called as Upanishads. Veda can also mean "knowledge" in general, so Vedānta can be taken to mean "the end, conclusion or finality of knowledge". Vedānta is one of six orthodox schools of Hindu philosophy.

=== Advaita Vedanta ===
While "a preferred terminology" for Upanisadic philosophy "in the early periods, before the time of Shankara" was Puruṣavāda, (Note: See also Purusha.) the Advaita Vedānta school has historically been referred to by various names, such as Advaita-vada (speaker of Advaita), Abheda-darshana (view of non-difference), Dvaita-vada-pratisedha (denial of dual distinctions), and Kevala-dvaita (non-dualism of the isolated). It is also called māyāvāda by Vaishnava opponents, akin to Madhyamaka Buddhism, due to their insistence that phenomena ultimately lack an inherent essence or reality.

"Advaita" (अद्वैत) is from Sanskrit roots a, not; dvaita, "customarily translated as dual". As Advaita, it is usually translated as "not-two" or "one without a second", and most commonly as "nondualism", "nonduality" or "nondual", invoking the notion of a dichotomy. Fabian Volker, following Paul Hacker explains that dvaita does not mean "duality", but "the state in which a second is present", the second here being synonymous with prapanca, "conceptual proliferation", and with jagat, "the world". Advaita thus means that only Brahman, 'the one', is ultimately real, while the phenomenal world, or the conceptual multiplicity, 'the second', is not fully real. The term thus does not emphasize two instances, but the notion that the second instance is not fully real, and advaita is better translated as "that which has no second beside it" instead of "nonduality", denying multiplicity and the proliferation of concepts "that tend to obscure the true state of affairs." (Note: According to Anantanand Rambachan, advaita describes the relation between Brahman, the origin of everything, and the world and the individual self. This relation is neither one nor two. It is not "one," because "[t]he world, as an effect, originates from Brahman and is dependent on Brahman for its existence." But it is also not "two," because Brahman is "the ultimate ontological ground of the world and the self.")

According to Richard King, a professor of Buddhist and Asian studies, the term Advaita first occurs in a recognizably Vedantic context in the prose of Mandukya Upanishad. According to Frits Staal, a professor of philosophy specializing in Sanskrit and Vedic studies, the word Advaita itself is from the Vedic era, and the Vedic sage Yajnavalkya (8th or 7th-century BCE) is credited to be the one who coined it. Stephen Phillips, a professor of philosophy and Asian studies, translates the Advaita containing verse excerpt in Brihadaranyaka Upanishad, as "An ocean, a single seer without duality becomes he whose world is Brahman." (Note: सलिले एकस् द्रष्टा अद्वैतस् भवति एष ब्रह्मलोकस् सम्राट् ति ह एनम् उवाच अनुशशास याज्ञवल्क्यस् एषा अस्य परमा गतिस् एषास्य परमा सम्पद् — Brihadaranyaka Upanishad 4.3.32 (Note: Sanskrit: Wikisource Archived 16 January 2024 at the Wayback Machine, Brihadaranyaka Upanishad 4.3.32) Translation: An ocean, a single seer without duality becomes he whose world is Brahman, O King, Yajnavalkya instructed This is his supreme way. This is his supreme achievement. — Transl: Stephen Phillips (Note: For an alternate English translation: Robert Hume, The Thirteen Principal Upanishads, BU 4.3.32, Oxford University Press, p. 138.) A reference to Non-duality is also made in the Chandogya Upanishad, within a dialogue between the Vedic sage Uddalaka Aruni and his son Svetaketu, as follows : सदेव सोम्येदमग्र आसीत एकमेवा अद्वितीयम् तद्धैक आहुरसदेवेदमग्र आसीदेकमेवाद्वितीयं तस्मादसतः सज्जायत — Chandogya Upanishad 6.2.1 (Note: Sanskrit: Wisdomlimb Archived 6 September 2022 at the Wayback Machine, Chandogya upnishad 6.2.1) Translation: Somya, before this world was manifest, there was only existence, one without duality On this subject, some maintain that before this world was manifest, there was only non-existence, one without a second. Out of that non-existence, existence emerged. — Chandogya Upanishad)

=== Advaita tradition ===
While the term "Advaita Vedanta" in a strict sense may refer to the scholastic tradition of textual exegesis established by Shankara and the monastic institutions, "advaita" in a broader sense may refer to a broad current of advaitic thought, which incorporates advaitic elements with yogic thought and practice and other strands of Indian religiosity, such as Kashmir Shaivism and the Nath tradition. The first connotation has also been called "Classical Advaita" and "doctrinal Advaita", and its presentation as such is due to mediaeval doxographies, the influence of Orientalist Indologists like Paul Deussen, and the Indian response to colonial influences, dubbed neo-Vedanta by Paul Hacker, who regarded it as a deviation from "traditional" Advaita Vedanta. Yet, post-Shankara Advaita Vedanta incorporated yogic elements, such as the Yoga Vasistha, and influenced other Indian traditions, and neo-Vedanta is based on this broader strand of Indian thought. This broader current of thought and practice has also been called "greater Advaita Vedanta", "vernacular advaita", and "experiential Advaita". It is this broader advaitic tradition which is commonly presented as "Advaita Vedanta", though the term "advaitic" may be more apt. (Note: Many of these traditions, which were influential among Neo-Vedantins, did not derive from Vedantic lineages, i.e., the "Advaita Vedanta" of Shankara. As Madaio (2017, p. 4) points out "...it is possible to speak of sanskritic and vernacular advaitic texts (which are either explicitly non-dualistic or permit a non-dualistic reading) and 'Advaita Vedanta' texts which originate within sampradayas that claim an Advaita Vedantic lineage. This, then, avoids the obfuscating tendency to subsume advaitic but non-vedantic works under a 'Vedanta' or 'Advaita Vedanta' umbrella.")

=== Monism ===
The nondualism of Advaita Vedānta is often regarded as an idealist monism. According to King, Advaita Vedānta developed "to its ultimate extreme" the monistic ideas already present in the Upanishads. (Note: King 1995, p. 65: "The prevailing monism of the Upanishads was developed by the Advaita Vedanta to its ultimate extreme.") In contrast, states Milne, it is misleading to call Advaita Vedānta "monistic", since this confuses the "negation of difference" with "conflation into one". Advaita is a negative term (a-dvaita), states Milne, which denotes the "negation of a difference", between subject and object, or between perceiver and perceived.

According to Deutsch, Advaita Vedānta teaches monistic oneness, however without the multiplicity premise of alternate monism theories. According to Jacqueline Suthren Hirst, Adi Shankara positively emphasizes "oneness" premise in his Brahma-sutra Bhasya 2.1.20, attributing it to all the Upanishads.

Nicholson states Advaita Vedānta contains realistic strands of thought, both in its oldest origins and in Shankara's writings.

== Soteriology: moksha – liberating knowledge of Brahman ==
=== Knowledge is liberating ===
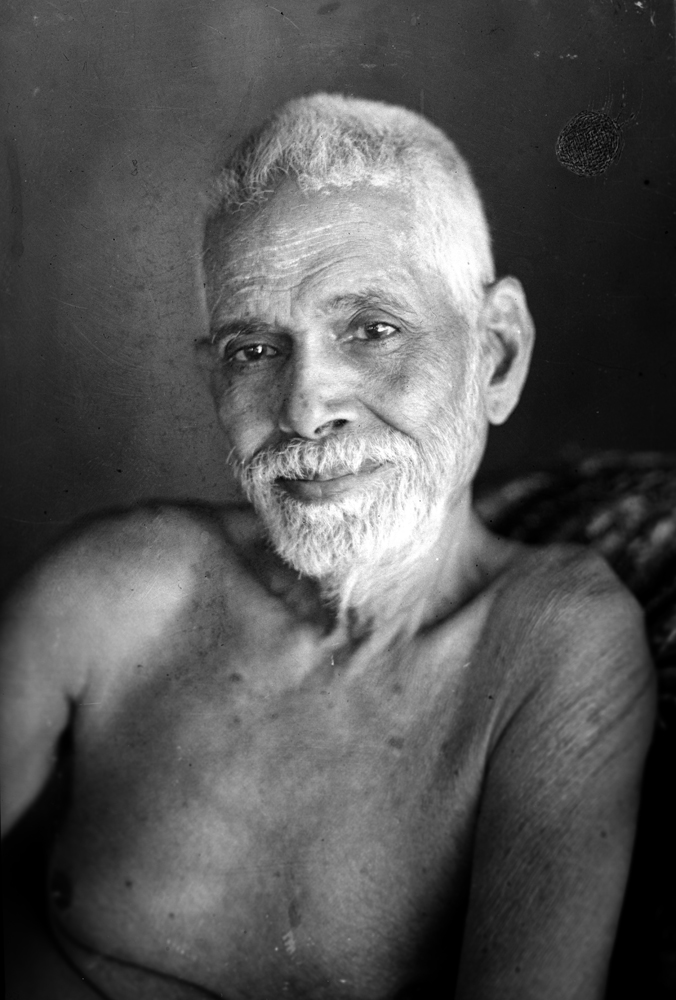
Ramana Maharshi, the Indian sage who is widely regarded as a Jivanmukta

The soteriological goal, in Advaita, is to gain self-knowledge as being in essence (Atman), awareness or witness-consciousness, and complete understanding of the real identity of jivan-ātman as Brahman. This is stated by Shankara as follows:

I am other than name, form and action.
My nature is ever free!
I am Self, the supreme unconditioned Brahman.
I am pure Awareness, always non-dual.

— Adi Shankara, Upadesasahasri 11.7, (Note: नामरूपक्रियारूपगुणदोषादिवर्जितः। स्वयं स्वतन्त्र आकाशकल्पः केवल आत्मकृत्॥ nāmarūpakriyārūpaguṇadoṣādi varjitaḥ)

Correct knowledge of Atman and Brahman is the attainment of Brahman, immortality, and moksha, liberation from suffering (Note: The suffering created by the workings of the mind entangled with physical reality) and samsara, the cycle of rebirth.

This Self is not a personal self, but the knowledge that everything is Brahman, (Note: Fowler 2002, pp. 30–31, 260–264: "As a philosophical and metaphysical term it [monism] refers to the acceptance of one single, ultimate, principle as the basis of the cosmos, the unity and oneness of all reality (...) [monism] has a model par excellence in that put forward by the eighth-century Indian philosopher Shankara, who is associated with the school of thought of Advaita Vedanta. (p. 263) – "In Shankara's words: 'the notions oneself and one's own are indeed falsely constructed (upon Atman) through nescience. When there is (the knowledge of) the oneness of Atman, these notions certainly do not exist. If the seed does not exist, whence shall the fruit arise?".) that "the self is the self of all, the knower of self sees the self in all beings and all beings in the self."

According to Advaita Vedānta, liberation can be achieved while living, and is called Jivanmukti. (Note: Jivanmukti is a state that transforms the nature, attributes and behaviors of an individual.After this transformation, the liberated individual shows attributes such as:(Aiyar 1914, pp. 140–147);(Nikhilananda 1958, pp. 53–79); (Fort 1998): he is not bothered by disrespect and endures cruel words, treats others with respect regardless of how others treat him; when confronted by an angry person he does not return anger, instead replies with soft and kind words; even if tortured, he speaks and trusts the truth; he does not crave for blessings or expect praise from others; he never injures or harms any life or being (ahimsa), he is intent in the welfare of all beings; he is as comfortable being alone as in the presence of others; he is as comfortable with a bowl, at the foot of a tree in tattered robe without help, as when he is in a mithuna (union of mendicants), grama (village) and nagara (city); he does not care about or wear sikha (tuft of hair on the back of head for religious reasons), nor the holy thread across his body. To him, knowledge is sikha, knowledge is the holy thread, knowledge alone is supreme. Outer appearances and rituals do not matter to him, only knowledge matters; for him there is no invocation nor dismissal of deities, no mantra nor non-mantra, no prostrations nor worship of gods, goddess or ancestors, nothing other than knowledge of Self; he is humble, high spirited, of clear and steady mind, straightforward, compassionate, patient, indifferent, courageous, speaks firmly and with sweet words.) in contrast to Videhamukti (moksha from samsara after death) in theistic sub-schools of Vedānta.

=== Attaining vidyā (knowledge) ===
Advaita Vedānta regards the liberated state of being Atman-Brahman as one's true identity and inherent to being human. According to Shankara and the Vivarana-school, no human action can 'produce' this liberated state, as it is what one already is. As Swami Vivekananda stated:

The Vedas cannot show you Brahman, you are That already. They can only help to take away the veil that hides truth from our eyes. The cessation of ignorance can only come when I know that God and I are one; in other words, identify yourself with Atman, not with human limitations. The idea that we are bound is only an illusion [Maya]. Freedom is inseparable from the nature of the Atman. This is ever pure, ever perfect, ever unchangeable.

— Adi Shankara's commentary on Fourth Vyasa Sutra, Swami Vivekananda

According to Shankara, taking a subitist position, moksha is attained at once when the mahavakyas, articulating the identity of Atman and Brahman, are understood. (Note: See also kelamuni (2006), The Philosophy of Adi Shankaracharya, section "II. The Threefold Means," on Brahma Sutra Bhashya 4.1.2 and subitism.)

Yet, the Advaita-tradition also emphasizes human effort, a path of Jnana Yoga with a progression of study and training to realize one's true identity as Atman-Brahman and attain moksha. According to the contemporary Advaita tradition, knowledge of Atman-Brahman is obtained gradually, by svādhyāya, study of the self and of the Vedic texts, which consists of four stages of samanyasa: virāga ('renunciation'), sravana ('listening to the teachings of the sages'), manana ('reflection on the teachings') and nididhyāsana, introspection and profound and repeated meditation on the mahavakyas, selected Upanishadic statements such as tat tvam asi ('that art thou' or 'you are That') which are taken literal, and form the srutic evidence for the identity of jivanatman and Atman-Brahman. This meditation negates the misconceptions, false knowledge, and false ego-identity, rooted in maya, which obfuscate the ultimate truth of the oneness of Brahman, and one's true identity as Atman-Brahman. This culminates in what Adi Shankara refers to as anubhava, immediate intuition, a direct awareness which is construction-free, and not construction-filled. It is not an awareness of Brahman, but instead an awareness that is Brahman. Although the threefold practice is broadly accepted in the Advaita tradition, and affirmed by Mandana Misra, it is at odds with Shankara, who took a subitist position.

Sruti (scriptures), proper reasoning and meditation are the main sources of knowledge (vidya) for the Advaita Vedānta tradition. It teaches that correct knowledge of Atman and Brahman is achievable by svādhyāya, study of the self and of the Vedic texts, and three stages of practice: sravana (perception, hearing), manana (thinking) and nididhyasana (meditation), a three-step methodology that is rooted in the teachings of chapter 4 of the Brihadaranyaka Upanishad.

According to critics of neo-Advaita, which also emphasizes direct insight, traditional Advaita Vedanta entails more than self-inquiry or bare insight into one's real nature, but also includes self-restraint, textual studies and ethical perfection. It is described in classical Advaita books like Shankara's Upadesasahasri and the Vivekachudamani, which is also attributed to Shankara.

==== Preparation: the fourfold qualities ====
The Advaita student has to develop the fourfold qualities, or behavioral qualifications (Samanyasa, Sampattis, sādhana-catustaya): (Note: These characteristics and steps are described in various Advaita texts, such as by Shankara in Chapter 1.1 of Brahmasutrabhasya, and in the Bhagavad Gita Chapter 10) A student in Advaita Vedānta tradition is required to develop these four qualities:

1. Nityānitya vastu viveka (नित्यानित्यवस्तुविवेकः) – Viveka is the ability to correctly discriminate between the real and eternal (nitya) and the substance that is apparently real, illusory, changing and transitory (anitya).
2. Ihāmutrārtha phala bhoga virāga (इहाऽमुत्रार्थफलभोगविरागः) – The renunciation (virāga) of all desires of the mind (bhoga) for sense pleasures, in this world (iha) and other worlds. Willing to give up everything that is an obstacle to the pursuit of truth and self-knowledge.
3. Śamādi ṣatka sampatti (शमादिषट्कसम्पत्तिः) – the sixfold virtues or qualities:
  1. Śama – mental tranquility, ability to focus the mind.
  2. Dama – self-restraint, (Note: Example self-restraints mentioned in Hindu texts: one must refrain from any violence that causes injury to others, refrain from starting or propagating deceit and falsehood, refrain from theft of others' property, refrain from sexually cheating on one's partner, and refrain from avarice.) the virtue of temperance. restraining the senses.
  3. Uparati – dispassion, lack of desire for worldly pleasures, ability to be quiet and disassociated from everything; discontinuation of all religious duties and ceremonies
  4. Titikṣa – endurance, perseverance, putting up with pairs of opposites (like heat and cold, pleasure and pain), ability to be patient during demanding circumstances
  5. Śraddhā – having faith in teacher and the Sruti scriptural texts
  6. Samādhāna – contentedness, satisfaction of mind in all conditions, attention, intentness of mind
4. Mumukṣutva (मुमुक्षुत्वम्) – An intense longing for freedom, liberation and wisdom, driven to the quest of knowledge and understanding. Having moksha as the primary goal of life

==== The threefold practice: sravana (hearing), manana (thinking) and nididhyasana (meditation) ====
The Advaita tradition teaches that correct knowledge, which destroys avidya, psychological and perceptual errors related to Atman and Brahman, is obtained in jnanayoga through three stages of practice, sravana (hearing), manana (thinking) and nididhyasana (meditation). This three-step methodology is rooted in the teachings of chapter 4 of the Brihadaranyaka Upanishad:

- Sravana, which literally means hearing. The student listens and discusses the ideas, concepts, questions and answers. of the sages on the Upanishads and Advaita Vedānta, studying the Vedantic texts, such as the Brahma Sutras, aided by discussions with the guru (teacher, counsellor).
- Manana refers to thinking on these discussions and contemplating over the various ideas based on svadhyaya and sravana. It is the stage of reflection on the teachings;
- Nididhyāsana, the stage of meditation and introspection. This stage of practice aims at realization and consequent conviction of the truths, non-duality and a state where there is a fusion of thought and action, knowing and being.

Although the threefold practice is broadly accepted in the Advaita tradition, Shankara's works show an ambivalence toward it: while accepting its authenticity and merits, as it is based in the scriptures, he also takes a subitist position, arguing that moksha is attained at once when the mahavakyas, articulating the identity of Atman and Brahman, are understood. According to Rambachan, "it is not possible to reconcile Sankara's views with this seemingly well-ordered system."

Mandana Misra, on the other hand, explicitly affirms the threefold practice as the means to acquire knowledge of Brahman, referring to meditation as dhyana. He states that these practices, though conceptual, 'can eliminate both ignorance and coneptuality at the same time, leaving only the "pure, transparent nature" of self-awareness'.

Bilimoria states that these three stages of Advaita practice can be viewed as sadhana practice that unifies Yoga and Karma ("action", referring here to ritual) ideas, and was most likely derived from these older traditions.

==== Guru ====
Advaita Vedānta school has traditionally had a high reverence for a Guru (teacher), and recommends that a competent Guru be sought in one's pursuit of spirituality, though this is not mandatory. Reading of Vedic literature and reflection is the most essential practice. Adi Shankara, states Comans, regularly employed compound words "such as Sastracaryopadesa (instruction by way of the scriptures and the teacher) and Vedāntacaryopadesa (instruction by way of the Upanishads and the teacher) to emphasize the importance of Guru". According to Comans, this reflects the Advaita tradition which holds a competent teacher as important and essential to gaining correct knowledge, freeing oneself from false knowledge, and to self-realization. Nevertheless, in the Bhamati-school the guru has a less essential role, as he can explain the teachings, but the student has to venture its further study.

In his commentary on the Mundaka Upanishad, Shankara states that a guru must be approached with sacrificial wood (samid) in hand in order to acquire knowledge of Brahman (para vidya). Shankara expands that such a guru should have virtues such as 'mercy', 'control of the mind', 'control of the senses', etc. He adds that this guru must be well versed in the Vedas (shrotriyam) and be centered with Brahman (brahma-nishtha), having relinquished the performance of all karmas.

A guru is someone more than a teacher, traditionally a reverential figure to the student, with the guru serving as a "counselor, who helps mold values, shares experiential knowledge as much as literal knowledge, an exemplar in life, an inspirational source and who helps in the spiritual evolution of a student. The guru, states Joel Mlecko, is more than someone who teaches specific type of knowledge, and includes in its scope someone who is also a "counselor, a sort of parent of mind and soul, who helps mold values and experiential knowledge as much as specific knowledge, an exemplar in life, an inspirational source and who reveals the meaning of life."

=== Pramana (means of knowledge) ===
In classical Indian thought, pramana (means of knowledge) concerns questions like how correct knowledge can be acquired; how one knows, how one does not; and to what extent knowledge pertinent about someone or something can be acquired. In contrast to other schools of Indian philosophy, early Vedanta paid little attention to pramana. The Brahmasutras are not concerned with pramana, and pratyaksa (sense-perception) and anumana (inference) refer there to sruti and smriti respectively. Shankara recognized the means of knowledge, (Note: Mayeda refers to statements from Shankara regarding epistemology (pramana-janya) in section 1.18.133 of Upadesasahasri, and section 1.1.4 of Brahmasutra-bhasya. NB: some manuscripts list Upadesasahasri verse 1.18.133 as 2.18.133, while Mayeda lists it as 1.18.133, because of interchanged chapter numbering.) but his thematic focus was upon metaphysics and soteriology, and he took for granted the pramanas. For Shankara, sabda is the only means of knowledge for attaining Brahman-jnana. According to Sengaku Mayeda, "in no place in his works [...] does he give any systematic account of them", taking Atman-Brahman to be self-evident (svapramanaka) and self-established (svatahsiddha), and "an investigation of the means of knowledge is of no use for the attainment of final release."

Nevertheless, the Advaita tradition accepts altogether six kinds of pramāṇas. While Adi Shankara emphasized Śabda (शब्द), relying on word, testimony of past or present reliable experts with regard to religious insights, and also accepted pratyakṣam (प्रत्यक्षम्), perception; and anumāṇam (अनुमानम्), inference; classical Advaita Vedānta, just like the Bhatta Purvamimamsaka school, also accepts upamāṇam (उपमानम्), comparison, analogy; arthāpattih (अर्थापत्तिः), postulation, derivation from circumstances; and anupalabdhih (अनुपलब्धिः), non-perception, negative/cognitive proof.

==== Samadhi ====
According to Dubois, Shankara's Advaita emphasizes that, since Brahman is ever-present, Brahman-knowledge is immediate and requires no 'action', that is, striving and effort; yet, the contemporary Advaita tradition, which is a yogic Advaita synthesis which developed in the late mediaeval period, also prescribes elaborate preparatory practice, including yogic samadhi, posing a paradox which is also recognized in other spiritual disciplines and traditions.

Shankara regarded the srutis as the means of knowledge of Brahman, and he was ambivalent about yogic practices and meditation, which at best may prepare one for Brahma-jnana. (Note: Neil Dalal (2021), Shankara Archived 27 January 2022 at the Wayback Machine, Stanford Encyclopedia of Philosophy) According to Rambachan, criticising Vivekananda, Shankara states that the knowledge of Brahman can only be obtained from inquiry of the Shruti, and not by Yoga or samadhi, which at best can only silence the mind. The Bhamati school and the Vivarana school differed on the role of contemplation, but they both "deny the possibility of perceiving supersensuous knowledge through popular yoga techniques." Later Advaita texts like the Dṛg-Dṛśya-Viveka (14th century) and Vedāntasara (of Sadananda) (15th century) added samādhi as a means to liberation, a theme that was also emphasized by Swami Vivekananda. The Vivekachudamani, traditionally attributed to Shankara but post-dating him, "conceives of nirvikalpa samadhi as the premier method of Self-realization over and above the well-known vedantic discipline of listening, reflection and deep contemplation." Koller states that yogic concentration is an aid to gaining knowledge in Advaita.

==== Anubhava ('experience') ====
The role of anubhava, anubhuti ("experience", "intuition") as "experience" in gaining Brahman-jnana is contested. While neo-Vedanta claims a central position for anubhava as "experience", Shankara himself regarded reliance on textual authority as sufficient for gaining Brahman-jnana, (Note: See also ramesam, AtmA anubhava / anubhUti (blog).) "the intuition of Brahman", and used anubhava interchangeably with pratipatta, "understanding". Arvind Sharma argues that Shankara's own "direct experience of the ultimate truth" guided him in selecting "those passages of the scriptures that resonate with this experience and will select them as the key with which to open previously closed, even forbidden, doors." (Note: Sharma 2000, p. 177 refers to Brahma Sutra Bhashya 4.1.15, "which tradition views as an allusion to his own direct experience of the ultimate truth." It runs as follows: [...] How can one contest the heart-felt cognition of another as possessing brahman-knowledge, even though bearing a body?)

The Vivekachudamani "explicit[ly] declar[es] that experience (anubhuti) is a pramana, or means of knowing (VCM 59)," and neo-Vedanta also accepts anubhava ("personal experience") as a means of knowledge. Dalal and others state that anubhava does not center around some sort of "mystical experience", but around the correct knowledge of Brahman. Nikhalananda concurs, stating that (knowledge of) Atman and Brahman can only be reached by buddhi, "reason", stating that mysticism is a kind of intuitive knowledge, while buddhi is the highest means of attaining knowledge.

==== Adhyaropa Apavada – imposition and negation ====
Since Gaudapada, who adopted the Buddhist four-cornered negation which negates any positive predicates of 'the Absolute', (Note: 1. Something is. 2. It is not. 3. It both is and is not. 4. It neither is nor is not.) a central method in Advaita Vedanta to express the inexpressable is the method called Adhyaropa Apavada. In this method, which was highly estimated by Satchidanandendra Saraswati, a property is imposed (adhyaropa) on Atman to convince one of its existence, whereafter the imposition is removed (apavada) to reveal the true nature of Atman as nondual and undefinable. In this method, "That which cannot be expressed is expressed through false attribution and subsequent denial." As Shankara writes, "First let me bring them on the right path, and then I will gradually be able to bring them round to the final truth afterwards." For example, Atman, the real "I", is described as witness, giving "it" an attribute to separate it from non-self. Since this implies a duality between observer and observed, next the notion of "witness" is dropped, by showing that the Self cannot be seen and is beyond qualifications, and only that what is remains, without using any words:

After one separates oneself i.e. 'I' or Atman from the sense objects, the qualities superimposed on Self are also negated by saying that which not being and not non-being, cannot be described by words, without beginning and end (BG 13.32) or as in Satyam Jnanam Anantam Brahman, beyond words, beyond mind and speech, etc. Here there is an attempt to negate the earlier attribute like being witness, bliss, most subtlest, etc. After this negation of false superimposition, Self Alone shines. One enters into the state of Nirvikalp Samadhi, where there is no second, no one to experience and hence this state cannot be described in words.

=== The Mahavakyas – recognising one's true identity ===
Moksha, liberation from suffering and rebirth and attaining immortality, is attained by disidentification from the body-mind complex and gaining self-knowledge as being in essence Brahman, "discovering one's identity with Brahman". According to Shankara, the individual Ātman and Brahman seem different at the empirical level of reality, but this difference is only an illusion, and at the highest level of reality they are really identical. The real self is Sat, "the Existent", that is, Atman-Brahman. Whereas the difference between Atman and non-Atman is deemed self-evident, knowledge of one's true identity as Brahman is revealed by the shruti, especially the Upanishadic statement tat tvam asi.

==== Mahavakyas ====
According to Shankara, a large number of Upanishadic statements reveal the identity of Atman and Brahman. In the Advaita Vedanta tradition, four of those statements, the Mahavakyas, which are taken literal, in contrast to other statements, have a special importance in revealing this identity. They are:

- तत्त्वमसि, tat tvam asi, Chandogya VI.8.7. Traditionally rendered as "That Thou Art" (that you are), with tat in Ch.U.6.8.7 referring to sat, "the Existent"); correctly translated as "That's how [thus] you are," with tat in Ch.U.6.12.3, its original location from where it was copied to other verses, referring to "the very nature of all existence as permeated by [the finest essence]"
- अहं ब्रह्मास्मि, aham brahmāsmi, Brhadāranyaka I.4.10, "I am Brahman," or "I am Divine."
- प्रज्ञानं ब्रह्म, prajñānam brahma, Aitareya V.3, "Prajñānam (Note: "Consciousness", "intelligence", "wisdom") is Brahman." (Note: "the Absolute", "infinite", "the Highest truth")
- अयमात्मा ब्रह्म, ayamātmā brahma, Mandukya II, "This Atman is Brahman."

==== That you are ====
The longest chapter of Shankara's Upadesasahasri, chapter 18, "That Art Thou", is devoted to considerations on the insight "I am ever-free, the existent" (sat), and the identity expressed in Chandogya Upanishad 6.8.7 in the mahavakya (great sentence) "tat tvam asi", "that thou art". In this statement, according to Shankara, tat refers to 'Sat, "the Existent" Existence, Being, or Brahman, the Real, the "Root of the world", (Note: While the Vedanta tradition equates sat ("the Existent") with Brahman, the Chandogya Upanishad itself does not refer to Brahman. Deutsch & Dalvi (2004, p. 8): "Although the text does not use the term brahman, the Vedanta tradition is that the Existent (sat) referred to is no other than Brahman.") the true essence or root or origin of everything that exists. "Tvam" refers to one's real I, pratyagatman or inner Self, the "direct Witness within everything", "free from caste, family, and purifying ceremonies", the essence, Atman, which the individual at the core is. As Shankara states in the Upadesasahasri:

Up.I.174: "Through such sentences as "Thou art That" one knows one's own Atman, the Witness of all the internal organs." Up.I.18.190: "Through such sentences as "[Thou art] the Existent" [...] right knowledge concerning the inner Atman will become clearer." Up.I.18.193–194: "In the sentence "Thou art That" [...] [t]he word "That" means inner Atman."

The statement "tat tvam asi" sheds the false notion that Atman is different from Brahman. According to Nakamura, the non-duality of atman and Brahman "is a famous characteristic of Sankara's thought, but it was already taught by Sundarapandya" (c.600 CE or earlier). Shankara cites Sundarapandya in his comments to Brahma Sutra verse I.1.4:

When the metaphorical or false atman is non-existent, [the ideas of my] child, [my] body are sublated. Therefore, when it is realized that 'I am the existent Brahman, atman', how can anyduty exist?

From this, and a large number of other accordances, Nakamura concludes that Shankar was not an original thinker, but "a synthesizer of existing Advaita and the rejuvenator, as well as a defender, of ancient learning."

==== Direct perception versus contemplation of the Mahavakyas ====
In the Upadesasahasri Shankara, Shankara is ambivalent on the need for meditation on the Upanishadic mahavakya. He states that "right knowledge arises at the moment of hearing", and rejects prasamcaksa or prasamkhyana meditation, that is, meditation on the meaning of the sentences, and in Up.II.3 recommends parisamkhyana, separating Atman from everything that is not Atman, that is, the sense-objects and sense-organs, and the pleasant and unpleasant things and merit and demerit connected with them. Yet, Shankara then concludes with declaring that only Atman exists, stating that "all the sentences of the Upanishads concerning non-duality of Atman should be fully contemplated, should be contemplated." As Mayeda states, "how they [prasamcaksa or prasamkhyana versus parisamkhyana] differ from each other in not known."

Prasamkhyana was advocated by Mandana Misra, the older contemporary of Shankara who was the most influential Advaitin until the 10th century. "According to Mandana, the mahavakyas are incapable, by themselves, of bringing about brahmajnana. The Vedanta-vakyas convey an indirect knowledge which is made direct only by deep meditation (prasamkhyana). The latter is a continuous contemplation of the purport of the mahavakyas. Vācaspati Miśra, a student of Mandana Misra, agreed with Mandana Misra, and their stance is defended by the Bhamati-school, founded by Vācaspati Miśra. In contrast, the Vivarana school founded by Prakasatman (c. 1200–1300) follows Shankara closely, arguing that the mahavakyas are the direct cause of gaining knowledge.

Shankara's insistence on direct knowledge as liberating also differs from the asparsa yoga described in Gaudapada's Mandukyakarika III.39–46. In this practice of 'non-contact' (a-sparśa), the mind is controlled and brought to rest, and does not create "things" (appearances) after which it grasps; it becomes non-dual, free from the subject-[grasping]-object dualism. Knowing that only Atman-Brahman is real, the creations of the mind are seen as false appearances (MK III.31–33). When the mind is brought to rest, it becomes or is Brahman (MK III.46).

==== Renouncement of ritualism ====
In the Upadesasahasri Shankara discourages ritual worship such as oblations to Deva (God), because that assumes the Self within is different from Brahman. (Note: Shankara, himself, had renounced all religious ritual acts; For an example of Shankara's reasoning "why rites and ritual actions should be given up", Elsewhere, Shankara's Bhasya on various Upanishads repeat "give up rituals and rites".) (Note: Compare Mookerji 2011 on Svādhyāya (Vedic learning). Mookerji (2011, pp. 29–31) notes that the Rigveda, and Sayana's commentary, contain passages criticizing as fruitless mere recitation of the Ŗik (words) without understanding their inner meaning or essence, the knowledge of dharma and Parabrahman. Mookerji (2011, pp. 29, 34) concludes that in the Rigvedic education of the mantras "the contemplation and comprehension of their meaning was considered as more important and vital to education than their mere mechanical repetition and correct pronunciation." Mookerji (2011, p. 35) refers to Sayana as stating that "the mastery of texts, akshara-praptī, is followed by artha-bodha, perception of their meaning." (Artha may also mean "goal, purpose or essence," depending on the context.) According to Mookerji (2011, p. 36), "the realization of Truth" and the knowledge of paramatman as revealed to the rishis is the real aim of Vedic learning, and not the mere recitation of texts.) The "doctrine of difference" is wrong, asserts Shankara, because, "he who knows the Brahman is one and he is another, does not know Brahman". The false notion that Atman is different from Brahman is connected with the novice's conviction that (Upadesasaharsi II.1.25)

...I am one [and] He is another; I am ignorant, experience pleasure and pain, am bound and a transmigrator [whereas] he is essentially different from me, the god not subject to transmigration. By worshipping Him with oblation, offerings, homage and the like through the [performance of] the actions prescribed for [my] class and stage of life, I wish to get out of the ocean of transmigratory existence. How am I he?

Recognizing oneself as "the Existent-Brahman", which is mediated by scriptural teachings, is contrasted with the notion of "I act", which is mediated by relying on sense-perception and the like. According to Shankara, the statement "Thou art That" "remove[s] the delusion of a hearer", "so through sentences as "Thou art That" one knows one's own Atman, the witness of all internal organs", and not from any actions. (Note: Up.I.18.219: "The renunciation of all actions becomes the means for discriminating the meaning of the word "Thou" since there is an [Upanisadic] teaching, "Having become calm, self-controlled [..., one sees Atman there in oneself]" (Bhr. Up. IV, 4, 23).") With this realization, the performance of rituals is prohibited, "since [the use of] rituals and their requisites is contradictory to the realization of the identity [of Atman] with the highest Atman."

== Philosophy: Reality/truth (Brahman, sat) and the world ==
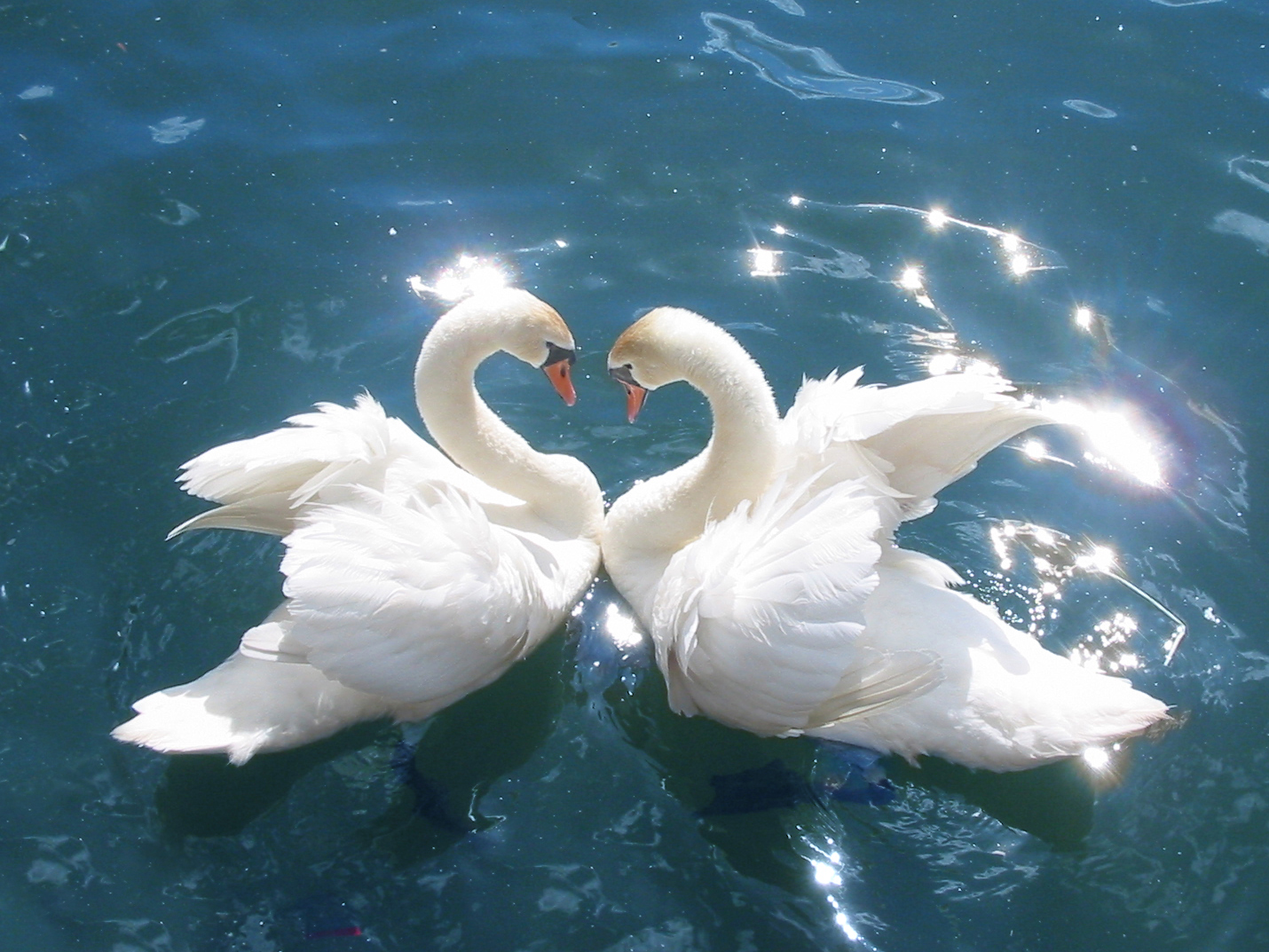
The swan is an important motif in Advaita. The white colour of swan symbolises Sattva guṇa and the ability to discern Satya (Real, Eternal) from Mithya (Unreal, Changing), just as the mythical swan Paramahamsa discerns milk from water.

Classical Advaita Vedānta states that all reality and everything in the experienced world has its root in Brahman, which is unchanging intelligent Consciousness. To Advaitins, there is no duality between a Creator and the created universe. All objects, all experiences, all matter, all consciousness, all awareness are somehow also this one fundamental reality Brahman. Yet, the knowing self has various experiences of reality during the waking, dream and dreamless states, and Advaita Vedānta acknowledges and admits that from the empirical perspective there are numerous distinctions. Advaita explains this by postulating different levels of reality, and by its theory of errors (anirvacaniya khyati).

=== Darśana (view) – central concerns ===
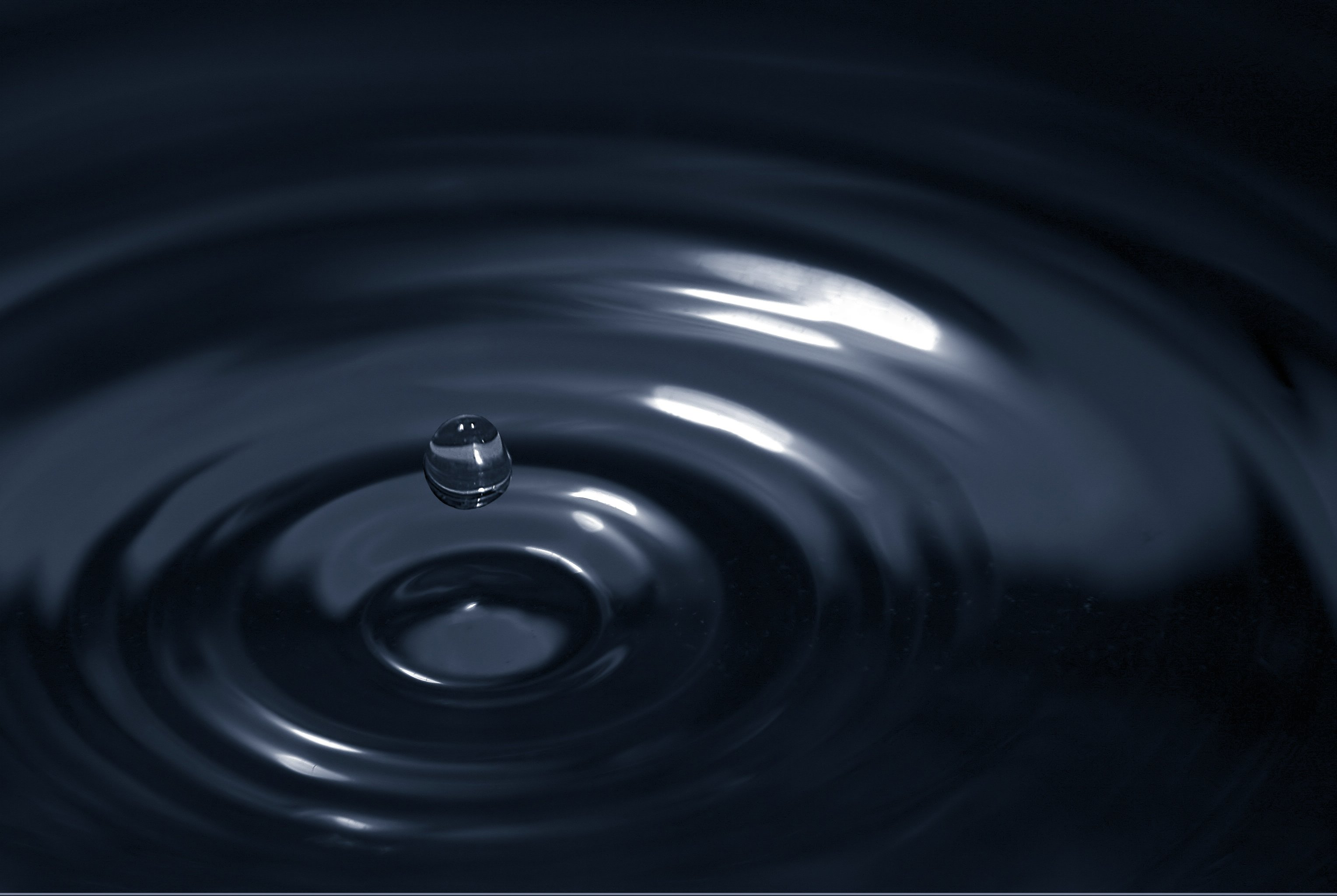
The ripple, Jivatman, is non-different from the water, Brahman.

Vedānta is one of the six classical Hindu darśanas, the Indian traditions of religious philosophy and practice which accept the authority of the Vedas. The various schools of Vedanta aim to harmonise the diverging views presented in the Prasthantrayi, the Principal Upanishads, along with the Brahma Sutras and the Bhagavad Gitā, offering an integrated body of textual interpretations and religious practices which aim at the attainment of moksha, release or liberation from transmigratory existence. (Note: It is not a philosophy in the western meaning of the word, according to Milne.)

==== Rejection of samkhya-dualism ====
"Samkhya is not one of the systems of Indian philosophy. Samkhya is the philosophy of India!"

— Gopinath Kaviraj

The Brahma Sutras, the constituting text of the Vedanta-tradition, rejects the purusha-prakriti dualism of the samkhya-tradition, and "much of the Brahmasutra appears to have been written to refute the perspective of the Samkhya school." Samkhya postulates two independent primal principles, purusha (primal consciousness) and prakriti (nature, which includes both matter and cognition and emotions). In samkhya, prakriti consists of three qualities (Guṇas), which are in balance, until they come in contact with purusha and the equilibrium is disturbed. From this pradhana then evolves the material universe, distinct from purusha, thereby postulating purusha as the efficient cause of all existence, and prakriti as its material cause or origin.

While closely related to Samkhya, the Advaita Vedānta tradition rejects this dualism, instead stating that reality cannot evolve from an inert, consciousness- and intelligence-less principle or essence. Brahman, which is intelligent and consciousness, is the sole reality, "that from which the origination, subsistence, and dissolution of this universe proceed", as stated in the second verse of the Brahman Sutras. In Samkhya, purusha is the efficient cause, and prakriti is the material cause: purusha causes prakriti to manifest as the natural world. Advaita, like all Vedanta schools, states that Brahman, consciousness, is both the efficient and the material cause, that from which the material universe evolves. Yet, in the Brahmasutras Brahma is a dynamic force, while the Advaita-tradition regards Brahman as an "essentially unchanging and static reality", since Brahman changing into something else would mean that Brahman would not exist anymore, while a partial change would leave Brahman divided.

==== Theoretical difficulties ====
By accepting that Brahman is the sole, unchanging reality, various theoretical difficulties arise which are not answered by the Brahmasutras, which asserts that the Upanishadic views have to be accepted due to their scriptural authority, "regardless of logical problems and philosophical inconsistencies". Advaita and other Vedānta traditions face several problems, for which they offer different solutions. According to Deutsch and Dalvi, "The basic problem of Vedanta [is] the relation between the plural, complex, changing phenomenal world and the Brahman in which it substantially subsists." According to Mayeda, following the post-Shankara predicate sat-cit-ananda, three problems emerge. First, how did Brahman, which is sat ('existence'), without any distinction, become manifold material universe? Second, how did Brahman, which is cit ('consciousness'), create the material world? Third, if Brahman is ananda ('bliss'), why did the empirical world of sufferings arise? The Brahma Sutras do not answer these philosophical queries, and later Vedantins including Shankara had to resolve them.

To solve these questions, Shankara introduced the concept of "Unevolved Name-and-Form", or primal matter corresponding to Prakriti, from which the world evolves, coming close to Samkhya dualism. Shankara's notion of "Unevolved Name-and-Form" was not adopted by the later Advaita tradition; instead, the later tradition turned avidya into a metaphysical principle, namely mulavidya or "root ignorance", a metaphysical substance which is the "primal material cause of the universe (upadana)". In this view, Brahman alone is real, and the phenomenal world is an appearance (maya) or "an unreal manifestation (vivarta) of Brahman". Prakasatmans (13th c.) defense of vivarta to explain the origin of the world, which declared phenomenal reality to be an illusion, became the dominant explanation, with which the primacy of Atman-Brahman can be maintained.

==== Relation between jivatman and Atman-Brahman ====
A main question in all schools of Vedanta is the relation between the individual self (jiva) and Atman/Brahman. As Shankara and his followers regard Atman-Brahman to be the ultimate Real, jivanatman is "ultimately [to be] of the nature of Atman-Brahman". This truth is established from a literal reading of selected parts of the oldest Principal Upanishads and Brahma Sutras, and is also found in parts of the Bhagavad Gitā and numerous other Hindu texts, and is regarded to be self-evident. (Note: Reason clarifies the truth and removes objections, according to the Advaita school, however it believes that pure logic cannot lead to philosophical truths and only experience and meditative insights do. The Sruti, it believes is a collection of experience and meditative insights about liberating knowledge,) Great effort is made to show the correctness of this reading, and its compatibility with reason and experience, by criticizing other systems of thought. Vidya, correct knowledge or understanding of the identity of jivan-ātman and Brahman, destroys or makes null avidya ('false knowledge'), and results in liberation. (Note: Sharma 1993, pp. 72–83: "According to Advaita, the pure subject is our true self whose knowledge is liberative, (...) If the subject could be realised in its purity then all misery would cease: this is called self-knowledge")

=== Three levels of Reality/truth ===
Shankara proposes three levels of reality, using sublation as the ontological criterion:

- Pāramārthika (paramartha, absolute), the Reality that is metaphysically true and ontologically accurate. It is the state of experiencing that "which is absolutely real and into which both other reality levels can be resolved". This reality is the highest; it cannot be sublated (assimilated) by any other. Ultimate reality only consists of Brahman. Everything else is like a dream.
- Vyāvahārika (vyavahara), or samvriti-saya, consisting of the empirical or pragmatical reality. It is ever changing over time, thus empirically true at a given time and context but not metaphysically true. It is "our world of experience, the phenomenal world that we handle every day when we are awake". It is the level in which both jiva (living creatures or individual Selfs) and Iswara are true; here, the material world is also true but this is incomplete reality and is sublatable. Vyāvahārika reality results from superimposing ignorance on Brahman, like seeing a snake instead of a rope.
- Prātibhāsika (pratibhasika, apparent reality, unreality), "reality based on imagination alone". It is the level of experience in which the mind constructs its own reality. Well-known examples of pratibhasika is the imaginary reality such as the "roaring of a lion" fabricated in dreams during one's sleep, and the perception of a rope in the dark as being a snake.

Absolute and relative reality are valid and true in their respective contexts, but only from their respective particular perspectives. John Grimes explains this Advaita doctrine of absolute and relative truth with the example of light and darkness. From the sun's perspective, it neither rises nor sets, there is no darkness, and "all is light". From the perspective of a person on earth, sun does rise and set, there is both light and darkness, not "all is light", there are relative shades of light and darkness. Both are valid realities and truths, given their perspectives. Yet, they are contradictory. What is true from one point of view, states Grimes, is not from another. To Advaita Vedānta, this does not mean there are two truths and two realities, but it only means that the same one Reality and one Truth is explained or experienced from two different perspectives.

As they developed these theories, Advaita Vedānta scholars were influenced by some ideas from the Nyaya, Samkhya and Yoga schools of Hindu philosophy. These theories have not enjoyed universal consensus among Advaitins, and various competing ontological interpretations have flowered within the Advaita tradition. (Note: Timalsina 2008, p. xvii: "Advaita can be approached from various angles. Not only are there multiple interpretations of Advaita, there are different starting points from which one can arrive at the conclusion of non-duality".)

=== Pāramārthika – Sat (True Reality) ===
==== Ātman ====
Ātman (IAST: ātman, Sanskrit: आत्मन्) is the "real self" (Note: Atman, Oxford Dictionaries, Oxford University Press (2012), Quote: "1. real self of the individual; 2. a person's soul") or "essence" (Note: Payne 2005, pp. 199–200 with p. 215 notes 5, 6: "A fourth metaphor is the monistic equation of the true or absolute self (atman) with absolute being (Brahman). In general, then, the conception of the self that emerges is one in which the self is in some way permanent, eternal, absolute or unchanging. It is also simultaneously universal and individual. The view is that there is an essence and that it can be known.") of the individual. It is caitanya, Pure Consciousness, a consciousness, states Sthaneshwar Timalsina, that is "self-revealed, self-evident and self-aware (svaprakashata)", and, states Payne, "in some way permanent, eternal, absolute or unchanging". It is self-existent awareness, limitless and non-dual. It is "a stable subjectivity, or a unity of consciousness through all the specific states of individuated phenomenality." Ātman, states Eliot Deutsch, is the "pure, undifferentiated, supreme power of awareness", it is more than thought, it is a state of being, that which is conscious and transcends subject-object divisions and momentariness. According to Ram-Prasad, "it" is not an object, but "the irreducible essence of being [as] subjectivity, rather than an objective self with the quality of consciousness."

According to Shankara, it is self-evident and "a matter not requiring any proof" that Atman, the 'I', is 'as different as light is from darkness' from non-Atman, the 'you' or 'that', the material world whose characteristics are mistakenly superimposed on Atman, resulting in notions as "I am this" and "This is mine." One's real self is not the constantly changing body, not the desires, not the emotions, not the ego, nor the dualistic mind, but the introspective, inwardly self-conscious "on-looker" (saksi), which is in reality completely disconnected from the non-Atman.

The jivatman or individual self is a mere reflection of singular Atman in a multitude of apparent individual bodies. It is "not an individual subject of consciousness", but the same in each person and identical to the universal eternal Brahman, a term used interchangeably with Atman.

Atman is often translated as soul, (Note: Soul: Atman, Oxford Dictionaries, Oxford University Press (2012), Quote: "1. real self of the individual; 2. a person's soul"; David Lorenzen (2004), The Hindu World (Editors: Sushil Mittal and Gene Thursby), Routledge, ISBN 0-415215277, pp. 208–209, Quote: "Advaita and nirguni movements, on the other hand, stress an interior mysticism in which the devotee seeks to discover the identity of individual soul (atman) with the universal ground of being (brahman) or to find god within himself"; Richard King (1995), Early Advaita Vedanta and Buddhism, State University of New York Press, ISBN 978-0791425138, p. 64, Quote: "Atman as the innermost essence or soul of man, and Brahman as the innermost essence and support of the universe. (...) Thus we can see in the Upanishads, a tendency towards a convergence of microcosm and macrocosm, culminating in the equating of atman with Brahman".; Chad Meister (2010), The Oxford Handbook of Religious Diversity, Oxford University Press, ISBN 978-0195340136, p. 63; Quote: "Even though Buddhism explicitly rejected the Hindu ideas of Atman (soul) and Brahman, Hinduism treats Sakyamuni Buddha as one of the ten avatars of Vishnu.") though the two concepts differ significantly, since "soul" includes mental activities, whereas "Atman" solely refers to detached witness-consciousness.

===== Three states of consciousness and Turiya =====
Advaita posits three states of consciousness, namely waking (jagrat), dreaming (svapna), deep sleep (suṣupti), which are empirically experienced by human beings, and correspond to the Three Bodies Doctrine:

1. The first state is the waking state, in which we are aware of our daily world. This is the gross body.
2. The second state is the dreaming mind. This is the subtle body.
3. The third state is the state of deep sleep. This is the causal body.

Advaita also posits "the fourth", Turiya, which some describe as pure consciousness, the background that underlies and transcends these three common states of consciousness. Turiya is the state of liberation, where states Advaita school, one experiences the infinite (ananta) and non-different (advaita/abheda), that is free from the dualistic experience, the state in which ajativada, non-origination, is apprehended. According to Candradhara Sarma, Turiya state is where the foundational Self is realized, it is measureless, neither cause nor effect, all pervading, without suffering, blissful, changeless, self-luminous, real, immanent in all things and transcendent. Those who have experienced the Turiya stage of self-consciousness have reached the pure awareness of their own non-dual Self as one with everyone and everything, for them the knowledge, the knower, the known becomes one, they are the Jivanmukta.

Advaita traces the foundation of this ontological theory in more ancient Sanskrit texts. For example, chapters 8.7 through 8.12 of Chandogya Upanishad discuss the "four states of consciousness" as awake, dream-filled sleep, deep sleep, and beyond deep sleep. One of the earliest mentions of Turiya, in the Hindu scriptures, occurs in verse 5.14.3 of the Brihadaranyaka Upanishad. (Note: Olivelle (1998, p. 77); Sanskrit (Wikisource): प्राणोऽपानो व्यान इत्यष्टावक्षराणि अष्टाक्षर ह वा एकं गायत्र्यै पदम् एतदु हैवास्या एतत् स यावदिदं प्राणि तावद्ध जयति योऽस्या एतदेवं पदं वेद अथास्या एतदेव तुरीयं दर्शतं पदं परोरजा य एष तपति यद्वै चतुर्थं तत्तुरीयम् दर्शतं पदमिति ददृश इव ह्येष परोरजा इति सर्वमु ह्येवैष रज उपर्युपरि तपत्य् एव हैव श्रिया यशसा तपति योऽस्या एतदेवं पदं वेद ॥ ३ ॥) The idea is also discussed in other early Upanishads.

===== Svayam prakāśa (self-luminosity) =====
Brahma Jnanavali Mala, attributed to Adi Shankara:

6. I am the indwelling consciousness, I am calm (free from all agitation), I am beyond prakriti (maya), I am of the nature of eternal bliss, I am the very Self, indestructible and changeless.

14. I am a mass of awareness and of consciousness. I am not a doer nor an experiencer. I am the very Self, indestructible and changeless.

Manisha Panchakam, attributed to Adi Shankara:

In the Advaita tradition, consciousness is svayam prakāśa, "self-luminous", which means that "self is pure awareness by nature." According to Dasgupta, it is "the most fundamental concept of the Vedanta." According to T. R. V. Murti, the Vedanta concept is explained as follows:

The point to be reached is a foundational consciousness that is unconditional, self-evident, and immediate (svayam-prakāśa). It is that to which everything is presented, but is itself no presentation, that which knows all, but is itself no object. The self should not be confused with the contents and states which it enjoys and manipulates. If we have to give an account of it, we can describe it only as what it is not, for any positive description of it would be possible only if it could be made an object of observation, which from the nature of the case it is not. We "know" it only as we withdraw ourselves from the body with which we happen to be identified, in this transition. (Note: Compare Fasching 2021: For Advaita Vedānta, consciousness is to be distinguished from all contents of consciousness that might be introspectively detectable: It is precisely consciousness of whatever contents it is conscious of and not itself one of these contents. Its only nature is, Advaita holds, prakāśa (manifestation); in itself it is devoid of any content or structure and can never become an object.)

According to Jonardon Ganeri, the concept was introduced by the Buddhist philosopher Dignāga (c.480–c.540 CE), and accepted by the Vedanta tradition; according to Zhihua Yao, the concept has older roots in the Mahasanghika school.

==== Brahman ====
According to Advaita Vedānta, Brahman is the true Self, consciousness, awareness, intelligent, possessed with will, and the only Reality (Sat). (Note: Brahman is also defined as: The unchanging, infinite, immanent, and transcendent reality which is all matter, energy, time, space, being, and everything beyond in this Universe; that is the one supreme, universal spirit without a second.(Brodd (2003); Vachatimanont (2005, pp. 47–48)); Bowker 2003, "Brahman": "(Skt., literally, 'growth' or 'expansion'). The one supreme, all pervading Spirit that is the origin and support of the phenomenal universe."; Puligandla 1997, p. 222 The supreme self. Puligandla states it as "the unchanging reality amidst and beyond the world."; The Self-existent, the Absolute and the Imperishable. Brahman is indescribable.Fowler 2005, p. 30: "Upanisadic thought is anything but consistent; nevertheless, there is a common focus on the acceptance of a totally transcendent Absolute, a trend which arose in the Vedic period. This indescribable Absolute is called Brahman [...].") Brahman is Paramarthika Satyam, "Absolute Truth" or absolute Real. It is That which is unborn and unchanging, and immortal. Other than Brahman, everything else, including the universe, material objects and individuals, are ever-changing and therefore maya. Brahman is "not sublatable", which means it cannot be superseded by a still higher reality:

the true Self, pure consciousness [...] the only Reality (sat), since It is untinged by difference, the mark of ignorance, and since It is the one thing that is not sublatable".

In Advaita, Brahman is the substrate and cause of all changes. Refuting samkhya, which considers pradhana or prakriti the material cause (primal matter) and purusha the efficient cause, in Advaita Vedanta Brahman is considered to be the material cause (Note: It provides the "stuff" from which everything is made) and the efficient cause (Note: It sets everything into working, into existence) of all that exists. The Brahma Sutras I.1.2 state that Brahman is:

...that from which the origination, subsistence, and dissolution of this universe proceed. (Note: Gambhirananda: "That (is Brahman) from which (are derived) the birth etc. of this (universe).")

Advaita's Upanishadic roots state Brahman's qualities (Note: Svarupalakshana, qualities, definition based on essence) to be Sat-cit-ānanda, "true being-consciousness-bliss", or "Eternal Bliss Consciousness". (Note: The Advaitin scholar Madhusudana Sarasvati explained Brahman as the Reality that is simultaneously an absence of falsity (sat), absence of ignorance (cit), and absence of sorrow/self-limitation (ananda).) A distinction is made between nirguna Brahman, formless Brahman, and saguna Brahman, Brahman with form, that is, Ishvara, God. Nirguna Brahman is undescribable, and the Upanishadic neti neti ('not this, not that' or 'neither this, nor that') negates all conceptualizations of Brahman.

=== Vyāvahārika (conventional reality) – Avidya and Māyā ===
==== Avidyā (ignorance) ====
Avidyā is a central tenet of Shankara's Advaita, and became the main target of Ramanuja's criticism of Shankara. In Shankara's view, avidyā is adhyasa, "the superimposition of the qualities of one thing upon another". As Shankara explains in the Adhyasa-bhasya, the introduction to the Brahmasutrabhasya:

Owing to an absence of discrimination, there continues a natural human behaviour in the form of 'I am this' or 'This is mine'; this is avidya. It is a superimposition of the attributes of one thing on another. The ascertainment of the nature of the real entity by separating the superimposed thing from it is vidya (knowledge, illumination).

Due to avidya, we are steeped in loka drsti, the empirical view. From the beginning we only perceive the empirical world of multiplicity, taking it to be the only and true reality. Due to avidyā there is ignorance, or nescience, of the real Self, Atman-Brahman, mistakenly identifying the Self with the body-mind complex. (Note: Encyclopædia Britannica, Maya Archived 4 November 2021 at the Wayback Machine) With parmartha drsti ignorance is removed and vidya is acquired, and the Real, distinctionless Brahman is perceived as the True reality.

The notion of avidyā and its relationship to Brahman creates a crucial philosophical issue within Advaita Vedānta thought: how can avidyā appear in Brahman, since Brahman is pure consciousness? For Shankara, avidya is a perceptual or psychological error. According to Satchidanandendra Saraswati, for Shankara "avidya is only a technical name to denote the natural tendency of the human mind that is engaged in the act of superimposition." The later tradition diverged from Shankara by turning avidya into a metaphysical principle, namely mulavidya or "root ignorance", a metaphysical substance which is the "primal material cause of the universe (upadana)", thereby setting aside Shankara's 'Unevolved Name-and-Form' as the explanation for the existence of materiality. According to Mayeda, "[i]n order to save monism, they characterized avidya as indefinable as real or unreal (sadasadbhyam anirvacanya), belonging neither to the category of being nor to that of non-being." In the 20th century, this theory of mulavidya became a point of strong contention among Advaita Vedantins, with Satchidanandendra Saraswati arguing that Padmapada and Prakasatman had misconstrued Shanakara's stance.

Shankara did not give a 'location' of avidya, giving precedence to the removal of ignorance. (Note: Compare Parable of the Poisoned Arrow) Sengaku Mayeda writes, in his commentary and translation of Adi Shankara's Upadesasahasri:

Certainly the most crucial problem which Sankara left for his followers is that of avidyā. If the concept is logically analysed, it would lead the Vedanta philosophy toward dualism or nihilism and uproot its fundamental position.

The later Advaita-tradition diverged from Shankara, trying to determinate a locus of avidya, with the Bhamati-school locating avidya in the jiva c.q. prakriti, while the Vivarana-school locates it in Brahman.

==== Māyā (appearance) ====
In Advaita Vedanta, the perceived empirical world, "including people and other existence", is Māyā, "appearance". Jiva, conditioned by the human mind, is subjected to experiences of a subjective nature, and misunderstands and interprets the physical, changing world as the sole and final reality. Due to avidya, we take the phenomenal world to be the final reality, while in Reality only Sat ( True Reality, Brahman) is Real and unchanging.

While Shankara took a realistic stance, and his explanations are "remote from any connotation of illusion", the 13th-century scholar Prakasatman, founder of the influential Vivarana school, introduced the notion that the world is illusory. According to Hacker, maya is not a prominent theme for Shankara, in contrast to the later Advaita tradition, and "the word maya has for [Shankara] hardly any terminological weight."

==== Five koshas (sheaths) ====
Due to avidya, atman is covered by koshas (sheaths or bodies), which hide man's true nature. According to the Taittiriya Upanishad, the Atman is covered by five koshas, usually rendered "sheath". They are often visualized like the layers of an onion. From gross to fine the five sheaths are:

1. Annamaya kosha, physical/food sheath
2. Pranamaya kosha, life-force sheath
3. Manomaya kosha, mental sheath
4. Vijnanamaya kosha, discernment/wisdom sheath
5. Anandamaya kosha, bliss sheath (Ananda)

=== Parinamavada and vivartavada – causality and change ===
Cause and effect are an important topic in all schools of Vedanta. (Note: These concepts are discussed in ancient and medieval texts of Hinduism, and other Indian religions, using synonymous terms. Cause is referred to as kāraṇa (कारण), nidana (निदान), hetu (हेतु) or mulam (मूलम्), while effect is referred to as kārya (कार्य), phala (फल), parinam (परिणाम) or Shungam (शुङ्ग). (Note: "cause". Archived from the original on 11 February 2017, "effect". Archived from the original on 11 February 2017, Sanskrit English Dictionary, University of Koeln, Germany.)) Two sorts of causes are recognised, namely Nimitta kāraṇa, the efficient cause, that which causes the existence of the universe, and Upādāna kāraṇa, the material cause, that from which the matery of this universe comes. All schools of Vedānta agree that Brahman is both the material and the efficient cause, and all subscribe to the theory of Satkāryavāda, which means that the effect is pre-existent in the cause. (Note: Advaita furthermore states that effect (kārya) is non-different from cause (kāraṇa), but the cause is different from the effect. This principle is called kārya-kāraṇa ananyatva. When the cause is destroyed, the effect will no longer exist. For example, cotton cloth is the effect of the cotton threads, which is the material cause. Without threads there will be no cotton cloth. Without cotton there will be no thread. According to Swami Sivananda, in his comments on the Brahmasūtra-Bhāṣya 2.1.9, Adi Shankara describes this as follows: ananyatve'pi kāryakāraṇayoḥ kāryasya kāraṇātmatvaṃ na tu kāraṇasya kāryātmatvaṃ Despite the non-difference of cause and effect, the effect has its self in the cause but not the cause in the effect. The effect is of the nature of the cause and not the cause the nature of the effect. Therefore the qualities of the effect cannot touch the cause.)

There are different views on the origination of the empirical world from Brahman. All commentators "agree that Brahman is the cause of the world", but disagree on how exactly Brahman is the cause of the world. According to Nicholson, "Mediaeval Vedantins distinguished two basic positions." Parinamavada is the idea that the world is a real transformation (parinama) of Brahman. Vivartavada is the idea that

the world is merely an unreal manifestation (vivarta) of Brahman. Vivartavada states that although Brahman appears to undergo a transformation, in fact no real change takes place. The myriad of beings are unreal manifestation, as the only real being is Brahman, that ultimate reality which is unborn, unchanging, and entirely without parts.

20th verse of Brahmajnanavalimala, attributed to Shankara:

ब्रह्म सत्यं जगन्मिथ्या
जीवो ब्रह्मैव नापरः

Brahman is real, the world is an illusion
Brahman and Jiva are not different.

Brahmajnanavalimala 1.20 (Note: Sanskrit:Sanskrit documents Archived 23 June 2021 at the Wayback Machine, Brahmajnanalimala 1.20)

The Brahma Sutras, the ancient Vedantins, most sub-schools of Vedānta, as well as Samkhya argue for parinamavada. The "most visible advocates of Vivartavada", states Nicholson, are the Advaitins, the followers of Shankara. "Although the world can be described as conventionally real", adds Nicholson, "the Advaitins claim that all of Brahman's effects must ultimately be acknowledged as unreal before the individual self can be liberated". (Note: According to Eliot Deutsch, Advaita Vedānta states that from "the standpoint of Brahman-experience and Brahman itself, there is no creation" in the absolute sense, all empirically observed creation is relative and mere transformation of one state into another, all states are provisional and a cause-effect driven modification.)

Yet, Adi Shankara himself most likely explained causality through parinamavada. In Shankara's works "Brahman constitutes the basic essence (svabhava) of the universe (BS Bh 3.2.21) and as such the universe cannot be thought of as distinct from it (BS Bh 2.1.14)." In Shankara's view, then, "The world is real, but only in so far as its existence is seen as totally dependent upon Brahman."

Shankara introduced the concept of "Unevolved Name-and-Form", or primal matter corresponding to Prakriti, from which the world evolves, but this concept was not adopted by the later Advaita tradition. Vivartavada became the dominant explanation, with which the primacy of Atman-Brahman can be maintained. Scholars such as Hajime Nakamura and Paul Hacker already noted that Adi Shankara did not advocate Vivartavada, and his explanations are "remote from any connotation of illusion". (Note: According to Hugh Nicholson, "the definitive study on the development of the concept of vivarta in Indian philosophy, and in Advaita Vedanta in particular, remains Hacker's Vivarta. According to Hacker, "the word maya has for [Shankara] hardly any terminological weight.")

Manisha Panchakam, attributed to Adi Shankara:

2. I am Brahman (pure consciousness). It is pure consciousness that appears as this universe.

It was the 13th-century scholar Prakasatman, who founded the influential Vivarana school, who gave a definition to vivarta, introducing the notion that the world is illusory. It is Prakasatman's theory that is sometimes misunderstood as Adi Shankara's position. Andrew Nicholson concurs with Hacker and other scholars, adding that the vivarta-vada is not Shankara's theory, that Shankara's ideas appear closer to parinama-vada, and the vivarta explanation likely emerged gradually in Advaita subschool later. (Note: Compare the misunderstanding of Yogacharas concept of vijñapti-mātra, 'representation-only', as 'consciousness-only'.)

== Ethics ==
Some claim, states Deutsch, "that Advaita turns its back on all theoretical and practical considerations of morality and, if not unethical, is at least 'a-ethical' in character". However, Deutsch adds, ethics does have a firm place in this philosophy. Its ideology is permeated with ethics and value questions enter into every metaphysical and epistemological analysis, and it considers "an independent, separate treatment of ethics are unnecessary". According to Advaita Vedānta, states Deutsch, there cannot be "any absolute moral laws, principles or duties", instead in its axiological view Atman is "beyond good and evil", and all values result from self-knowledge of the reality of "distinctionless Oneness" of one's real self, every other being and all manifestations of Brahman. Advaitin ethics includes lack of craving, lack of dual distinctions between one's own Self and another being's, good and just Karma.

The values and ethics in Advaita Vedānta emanate from what it views as inherent in the state of liberating self-knowledge. This state, according to Rambachan, includes and leads to the understanding that "the self is the self of all, the knower of self sees the self in all beings and all beings in the self." Such knowledge and understanding of the indivisibility of one's and other's Atman, Advaitins believe leads to "a deeper identity and affinity with all". It does not alienate or separate an Advaitin from his or her community, rather awakens "the truth of life's unity and interrelatedness". These ideas are exemplified in the Isha Upanishad – a sruti for Advaita, as follows:

One who sees all beings in the self alone, and the self of all beings,
feels no hatred by virtue of that understanding.
For the seer of oneness, who knows all beings to be the self,
where is delusion and sorrow?

— Isha Upanishad 6–7, Translated by A Rambachan

Adi Shankara, in verse 1.25 to 1.26 of his Upadeśasāhasrī, asserts that the Self-knowledge is understood and realized when one's mind is purified by the observation of Yamas (ethical precepts) such as Ahimsa (non-violence, abstinence from injuring others in body, mind and thoughts), Satya (truth, abstinence from falsehood), Asteya (abstinence from theft), Aparigraha (abstinence from possessiveness and craving) and a simple life of meditation and reflection. Rituals and rites can help focus and prepare the mind for the journey to Self-knowledge, but can be abandoned when moving on to "hearing, reflection, and meditation on the Upanishads".

Elsewhere, in verses 1.26–1.28, the Advaita text Upadesasahasri states the ethical premise of equality of all beings. Any Bheda (discrimination), states Shankara, based on class or caste or parentage is a mark of inner error and lack of liberating knowledge. This text states that the fully liberated person understands and practices the ethics of non-difference.

One, who is eager to realize this highest truth spoken of in the Sruti, should rise above the fivefold form of desire: for a son, for wealth, for this world and the next, and are the outcome of a false reference to the Self of Varna (castes, colors, classes) and orders of life. These references are contradictory to right knowledge, and reasons are given by the Srutis regarding the prohibition of the acceptance of difference. For when the knowledge that the one non-dual Atman (Self) is beyond phenomenal existence is generated by the scriptures and reasoning, there cannot exist a knowledge side by side that is contradictory or contrary to it.

— Adi Shankara, Upadesha Sahasri 1.44, (Note: Śaṅkarācārya 1949, p. 32; Sanskrit: तच् चैतत् परमार्थदर्शनं प्रतिपत्तुमिच्छता वर्णाश्रमाद्यभिमान-कृतपाञ्क्तरूपपुत्रवित्तलोकैषणादिभ्यो व्युत्थानं कर्तव्यम् । सम्यक्प्रत्ययविरोधात् तदभिमानस्य भेददर्शनप्रतिषेधार्थोपपत्तिश्चोपपद्यते । न ह्येकस्मिन्नात्मन्यसंसारित्वबुद्धौ शास्त्रन्यायोत्पादितायां तद्विपरीता बुद्धिर्भवति । न ह्य् अग्नौ शितत्वबुद्धिः, शरीरे वाजरामरणबुद्धिः । तस्मादविद्याकार्यत्वात् सर्वकर्मणां तत्साधनानां च यज्ञोपवीतादीनां परमार्थदर्शनिष्टेन त्यागः कर्तव्यः ॥ ४४॥)

== Texts ==
The Upanishads, the Bhagavad Gitā and Brahma Sutras are the central texts of the Advaita Vedānta tradition, lending authority to the doctrines about the identity of Atman and Brahman and their changeless nature.

Adi Shankara gave a nondualist interpretation of these texts in his commentaries. Adi Shankara's Bhashya (commentaries) have become central texts in the Advaita Vedānta philosophy, but are one among many ancient and medieval manuscripts available or accepted in this tradition. The subsequent Advaita tradition has further elaborated on these sruti and commentaries. Adi Shankara is also credited for the famous text Nirvana Shatakam.

=== Prasthanatrayi ===
The Vedānta tradition provides exegeses of the Upanishads, the Brahma Sutras, and the Bhagavadgita, collectively called the Prasthanatrayi, literally, three sources.

1. The Upanishads, (Note: Many in number, the Upanishads developed in different schools at various times and places, some in the Vedic period and others in the medieval or modern era (the names of up to 112 Upanishads have been recorded). All major commentators have considered the twelve to thirteen oldest of these texts as the principal Upanishads and as the foundation of Vedanta.) or Śruti prasthāna; considered the Śruti (Vedic scriptures) foundation of Vedānta. (Note: The Śruti includes the four Vedas including its four layers of embedded texts – the Samhitas, the Brahmanas, the Aranyakas, and the early Upanishads.) Most scholars, states Eliot Deutsch, are convinced that the Śruti in general, and the Upanishads in particular, express "a very rich diversity" of ideas, with the early Upanishads such as Brihadaranyaka Upanishad and Chandogya Upanishad being more readily amenable to Advaita Vedānta school's interpretation than the middle or later Upanishads. In addition to the oldest Upanishads, states Williams, the Sannyasa Upanishads group composed in pre-Shankara times "express a decidedly Advaita outlook".
2. The Brahma Sutras, or Nyaya prasthana / Yukti prasthana; considered the reason-based foundation of Vedānta. The Brahma Sutras attempted to synthesize the teachings of the Upanishads. The diversity in the teachings of the Upanishads necessitated the systematization of these teachings. The only extant version of this synthesis is the Brahma Sutras of Badarayana. Like the Upanishads, Brahma Sutras is also an aphoristic text, and can be interpreted as a non-theistic Advaita Vedānta text or as a theistic Dvaita Vedānta text. This has led, states Stephen Phillips, to its varying interpretations by scholars of various sub-schools of Vedānta. The Brahmasutra is considered by the Advaita school as the Nyaya Prasthana (canonical base for reasoning).
3. The Bhagavad Gitā, or Smriti prasthāna; considered the Smriti (remembered tradition) foundation of Vedānta. It has been widely studied by Advaita scholars, including a commentary by Adi Shankara.

=== Textual authority ===
The Advaita Vedānta tradition considers the knowledge claims in the Vedas to be the crucial part of the Vedas, not its karma-kanda (ritual injunctions). The knowledge claims about self being identical to the nature of Atman-Brahman are found in the Upanishads, which Advaita Vedānta has regarded as "errorless revealed truth". Nevertheless, states Koller, Advaita Vedantins did not entirely rely on revelation, but critically examined their teachings using reason and experience, and this led them to investigate and critique competing theories.

Advaita Vedānta, like all orthodox schools of Hindu philosophy, accepts as an epistemic premise that Śruti (Vedic literature) is a reliable source of knowledge. The Śruti includes the four Vedas including its four layers of embedded texts – the Samhitas, the Brahmanas, the Aranyakas and the early Upanishads. Of these, the Upanishads are the most referred to texts in the Advaita school.

The possibility of different interpretations of the Vedic literature, states Arvind Sharma, was recognized by ancient Indian scholars. The Brahmasutra (also called Vedānta Sutra, composed in 1st millennium BCE) accepted this in verse 1.1.4 and asserts the need for the Upanishadic teachings to be understood not in piecemeal cherrypicked basis, rather in a unified way wherein the ideas in the Vedic texts are harmonized with other means of knowledge such as perception, inference and remaining pramanas. This theme has been central to the Advaita school, making the Brahmasutra as a common reference and a consolidated textual authority for Advaita.

The Bhagavad Gitā, similarly in parts can be interpreted to be a monist Advaita text, and in other parts as theistic Dvaita text. It too has been widely studied by Advaita scholars, including a commentary by Adi Shankara.

=== Other texts ===
A large number of texts are attributed to Shankara; of these texts, the Brahma Sutra Bhasya (commentary on the Brahma Sutras), the commentaries on the principal Upanishads, and the Upadesasahasri are considered genuine and stand out.

Post-Shankara Advaita saw the composition of both scholarly commentaries and treatises, as well as, from late mediaeval times (14th century) on, popular works and compositions which incorporate Yoga ideas. These include notable texts mistakenly attributed to Shankara, such as the Vivekachudamani, Atma bodha, and Aparokshanubhuti; and other texts like Advaita Bodha Deepika and Dŗg-Dŗśya-Viveka. Texts which influenced the Advaita tradition include the Avadhuta Gita, the Yoga Vasistha, and the Yoga Yajnavalkya.

== Sampradaya and Smarta tradition ==
=== Monastic order – Mathas ===
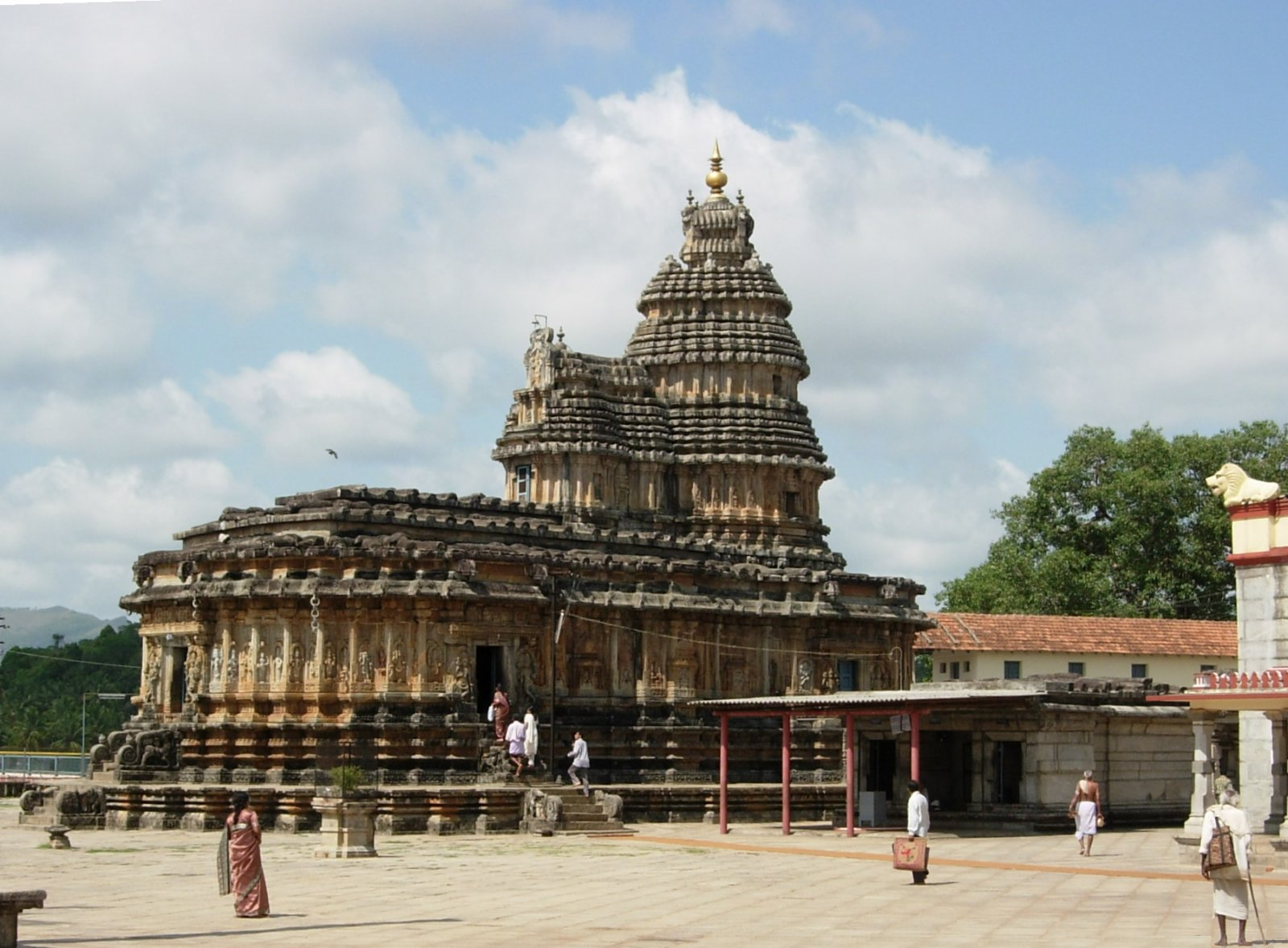
(Vidyashankara temple) at Sringeri Sharada Peetham, Shringeri

Advaita Vedānta is not just a philosophical system, but also a tradition of monastic renunciation. Philosophy and renunciation are closely related:

Most of the notable authors in the advaita tradition were members of the sannyasa tradition, and both sides of the tradition share the same values, attitudes and metaphysics.

According to tradition, around 740 CE Gaudapada founded Shri Gaudapadacharya Math (Note: Sanskrit: श्री संस्थान गौडपदाचार्य मठ, Śrī Sansthāna Gauḍapadācārya Maṭha), also known as Kavaḷē maṭha. It is located in Kavale, Ponda, Goa, and is the oldest matha of the South Indian Saraswat Brahmins. (Note: Kavale Math Official Website)

Shankara, himself considered to be an incarnation of Shiva, is credited with establishing the Dashanami Sampradaya, organizing a section of the Ekadandi monks under an umbrella grouping of ten names. Several Hindu monastic and Ekadandi traditions, however, remained outside the organisation of the Dasanāmis.

Sankara is said to have organised the Hindu monks of these ten sects or names under four Maṭhas (Sanskrit: मठ) (monasteries), called the Amnaya Mathas, with the headquarters at Dvārakā in the West, Jagannatha Puri in the East, Sringeri in the South and Badrikashrama in the North. According to tradition, each math was first headed by one of his four main disciples, and the tradition continues since then. Yet, according to Paul Hacker, no mention of the mathas can be found before the 14th century CE. Until the 15th century, the timespan of the directors of Sringeri Math are unrealistically long, spanning 60+ and even 105 years. After 1386, the timespans become much shorter. According to Hacker, these mathas may have originated as late as the 14th century, to propagate Shankara's view of Advaita. (Note: Nakamura also recognized the influence of these mathas, which he argues contributed to the influence of Shankara, which was "due to institutional factors". The mathas which he established remain active today, and preserve the teachings and influence of Shankara, "while the writings of other scholars before him came to be forgotten with the passage of time".) (Note: According to Pandey, these Mathas were not established by Shankara himself, but were originally ashrams established by Vibhāņdaka and his son Ŗșyaśŗnga. Shankara inherited the ashrams at Dvārakā and Sringeri, and shifted the ashram at Śŗngaverapura to Badarikāśrama, and the ashram at Angadeśa to Jagannātha Purī.) According to another tradition in Kerala, after Sankara's samadhi at Vadakkunnathan Temple, his disciples founded four mathas in Thrissur, namely Naduvil Madhom, Thekke Madhom, Idayil Madhom and Vadakke Madhom.

Monks of these ten orders differ in part in their beliefs and practices, and a section of them is not considered to be restricted to specific changes attributed to Shankara. While the dasanāmis associated with the Sankara maths follow the procedures attributed to Adi Śankara, some of these orders remained partly or fully independent in their belief and practices; and outside the official control of the Sankara maths. The advaita sampradaya is not a Saiva sect, despite the historical links with Shaivism. (Note: Sanskrit.org: "Advaitins are non-sectarian, and they advocate worship of Siva and Visnu equally with that of the other deities of Hinduism, like Sakti, Ganapati and others.") Nevertheless, contemporary Sankaracaryas have more influence among Saiva communities than among Vaisnava communities.

=== Smarta Tradition ===
The Smarta tradition of Hinduism is a synthesis of various strands of Indian religious thought and practice, which developed with the Hindu synthesis, dating back to the early first century CE. (Note: Archeological evidence suggest that the Smarta tradition in India dates back to at least 3rd-century CE.) It is particularly found in south and west India, and reveres all Hindu divinities as a step in their spiritual pursuit. Their worship practice is called Panchayatana puja. The worship symbolically consists of five deities: Shiva, Vishnu, Devi or Durga, Surya and an Ishta Devata or any personal god of devotee's preference.

In the Smarta tradition, Advaita Vedānta ideas combined with bhakti are its foundation. Adi Shankara is regarded as the greatest teacher and reformer of the Smarta. According to Alf Hiltebeitel, Shankara's Advaita Vedānta and practices became the doctrinal unifier of previously conflicting practices with the smarta tradition. (Note: Practically, Shankara fostered a rapprochement between Advaita and smarta orthodoxy, which by his time had not only continued to defend the varnasramadharma theory as defining the path of karman, but had developed the practice of pancayatanapuja ("five-shrine worship") as a solution to varied and conflicting devotional practices. Thus one could worship any one of five deities (Vishnu, Siva, Durga, Surya, Ganesa) as one's istadevata ("deity of choice").)

Philosophically, the Smarta tradition emphasizes that all images and statues (murti), or just five marks or any anicons on the ground, are visibly convenient icons of spirituality saguna Brahman. The multiple icons are seen as multiple representations of the same idea, rather than as distinct beings. These serve as a step and means to realizing the abstract Ultimate Reality called nirguna Brahman. The ultimate goal in this practice is to transition past the use of icons, then follow a philosophical and meditative path to understanding the oneness of Atman (Self) and Brahman – as "That art Thou".

== Buddhist influences on Advaita Vedānta ==
=== Similarities with Buddhism ===
Advaita Vedānta and other schools of Hindu philosophy share numerous terminology, doctrines, and dialectical techniques with Buddhism. According to a 1918 paper by the Buddhist scholar O. Rozenberg, "a precise differentiation between Brahmanism and Buddhism is impossible to draw." T. R. V. Murti notices that "the ultimate goal" of Vedānta, Sāṃkhya, and Mahāyāna Buddhism is "remarkably similar"; while Advaita Vedānta postulates a "foundational self", according to Murti "Mahāyāna Buddhism implicitly affirms the existence of a deep underlying reality behind all empirical manifestations in its conception of śūnyatā (the indeterminate, the void), or vijñapti-mātra (consciousness only), or tathātā (thatness), or dhārmata (noumenal reality)." According to Frank Whaling, the similarities between Advaita Vedānta and Buddhism are not limited to the terminology and some doctrines, but also includes practice. The monastic practices and monk tradition in Advaita Vedānta are similar to those found in Buddhism.

=== Mahāyāna philosophy ===
The influence of Mahāyāna Buddhism on Advaita Vedānta has been significant. Sharma points out that the early commentators on the Brahma Sūtras were all realists, or pantheist realists. He states that they were influenced by Buddhism, particularly during the 5th–6th centuries CE with the development of the Yogācāra school of Buddhist philosophy. Von Glasenapp states that there was a mutual influence between Vedānta and Buddhism. (Note: Helmuth von Glasenapp (1995), Vedanta & Buddhism: A comparative study, Buddhist Publication Society, pages 2–3, Quote: "Vedānta and Buddhism have lived side by side for such a long time that obviously they must have influenced each other. The strong predilection of the Indian mind for a doctrine of universal unity has led the representatives of Mahāyāna to conceive Saṃsāra and Nirvāṇa as two aspects of the same and single true reality; for Nāgārjuna the empirical world is a mere appearance, as all dharmas, manifest in it, are perishable and conditioned by other dharmas, without having any independent existence of their own. Only the indefinable "Voidness" (Śūnyatā) to be grasped in meditation, and realized in Nirvāṇa, has true reality [in Buddhism]".) S. N. Dasgupta and Mohanta suggest that Buddhism and Advaita Vedānta represent "different phases of development of the same non-dualistic metaphysics from the Upanishadic period to the time of Śaṅkara." (Note: This development did not end with Advaita Vedānta but continued in Tantrism and various schools of Shaivism. Non-dual Kashmir Shaivism, for example, was influenced by, and took over doctrines from, several orthodox and heterodox Indian religious and philosophical traditions. These include the orthodox Hindu schools of Vedānta, Sāṃkhya, Patañjali's Yoga tradition, and Nyāya, and prominent Buddhist schools, including Yogācāra and Mādhyamaka, but also Tantra and the Nath-tradition.)

The influence of Buddhist doctrines on Gauḍapāda has been a vexed question. Modern scholarship generally accepts that Gauḍapāda was influenced by Buddhism, at least in terms of using Buddhist terminology to explain his ideas, but adds that Gauḍapāda was a Vedantin and not a Buddhist. Ādi Śaṅkara, states Natalia Isaeva, incorporated "into his own system a Buddhist notion of māyā which had not been minutely elaborated in the Upanishads". According to Mudgal, Śaṅkara's Advaita view and Nāgārjuna's Mādhyamaka view of ultimate reality are compatible because they are both transcendental, indescribable, non-dual and only arrived at through a via negativa or neti neti. Mudgal concludes therefore that "the difference between Śūnyavāda philosophy of Buddhism and Advaita philosophy of Hinduism may be a matter of emphasis, not of kind". Similarly, there are many points of contact between the Buddhist Yogācāra school and Śaṅkara's Advaita tradition. According to S. N. Dasgupta,

Śaṅkara and his followers borrowed much of their dialectic form of criticism from the Buddhists. His Brahman was very much like the śūnya of Nāgārjuna [...] The debts of Śaṅkara to the self-luminosity of the Vijñānavāda Buddhism can hardly be overestimated. There seems to be much truth in the accusations against Śaṅkara by Vijñāna Bhikṣu and others that he was a hidden Buddhist himself. I am led to think that Śaṅkara's philosophy is largely a compound of Vijñānavāda and Śūnyavāda Buddhism with the Upanishadic notion of the permanence of self superadded.

=== Differences from Buddhism ===
The Advaita Vedānta tradition has historically rejected accusations of crypto-Buddhism highlighting their respective views on Ātman, Anattā, and Brahman. Yet, some early Buddhist texts (1st millennium CE), such as the Mahāyāna Buddhist scriptures Tathāgatagarbha Sūtras suggest "self-like" concepts, variously called Tathāgatagarbha or "Buddha nature". In modern era studies, scholars such as Wayman state that these "self-like" concepts are neither self nor sentient being, nor individual soul, nor personality. Some scholars posit that the Tathāgatagarbha Sūtras were written to promote Buddhism to non-Buddhists.

The epistemological foundations of Buddhism and Advaita Vedānta are different. Buddhism accepts two valid means to reliable and correct knowledge—perception and inference, while Advaita Vedānta accepts six (described elsewhere in this article). However, some Buddhists in history, have argued that Buddhist scriptures are a reliable source of spiritual knowledge, corresponding to Advaita's Śabda pramana, however Buddhists have treated their scriptures as a form of inference method.

Advaita Vedānta posits a substance ontology, an ontology which holds that underlying the change and impermanence of empirical reality is an unchanging and permanent absolute reality, like an eternal substance it calls Ātman-Brahman. In its substance ontology, as like other philosophies, there exist a universal, particulars, and specific properties, and it is the interaction of particulars that create events and processes. In contrast, Buddhism posits a process ontology, also called as "event ontology". According to Buddhist philosophy, particularly after the rise of ancient Mahāyāna Buddhist scholarship, the concept of impermanence (anicca) is understood as one of the three marks of existence (trilakṣaṇa): there is neither empirical nor absolute permanent reality, because all phenomena are characterized by their lack of a solid and independent existence (svabhāva), and ontology can be explained as a process. (Note: Kalupahana describes how in Buddhism there is also a current which favours substance ontology. Kalupahanan sees Mādhyamaka and Yogācāra as reactions against developments toward substance ontology in Buddhism.)

In Buddhist ontology, there is a system of dependent origination and interdependent phenomena (pratītya-samutpāda) but no stable persistent identities, neither eternal universals nor particulars. In Buddhism, thoughts and memories are mental constructions and fluid processes (skandhā) without a real observer, personal agent, or cognizer (anattā). By contrast, in Advaita Vedānta and the other orthodox schools of Hinduism, the eternal, unchanging ultimate self (ātman) identical with Brahman is understood as the real observer, personal agent, and cognizer. However, the historical Buddha considered this Brahmanical belief to be one of the six wrong views about the self; in fact, Buddha held that attachment to the appearance of a permanent self in this world of change is the cause of suffering (duḥkha), and the main obstacle to the attainment of spiritual liberation (mokṣa).

=== Criticisms of concurring Hindu schools ===
Some Hindu scholars have criticized Advaita Vedānta for its notion of māyā and non-theistic doctrinal similarities with Buddhism, sometimes referring to the Advaita tradition as Māyāvāda.

Bhāskara, a Hindu philosopher of the Bhedabheda Vedānta school (9th century CE), accused Śaṅkara's Advaita tradition as "this despicable broken down Māyāvāda that has been chanted by the Mahāyāna Buddhists", characterizing it as a school that is undermining the ritual duties set in Vedic orthodoxy.

Rāmāṉuja, a Hindu saint and founder of the Vishishtadvaita Vedānta school (12th century CE), similarly accused Ādi Śaṅkara of being a Prachanna Bauddha, that is, a "crypto-Buddhist", and someone who was undermining the theistic Bhakti-oriented devotionalism.

== Relationship with other traditions ==
The Advaita Vedānta ideas, particularly of 8th century Adi Shankara, were challenged by theistic Vedānta philosophies that emerged centuries later, such as the 11th-century Vishishtadvaita (qualified nondualism) of Ramanuja, and the 14th-century Dvaita (theistic dualism) of Madhvacharya. Their application of Vedanta philosophy to ground their faith turned Vedanta into a major factor in India's religious landscape.

=== Vishishtadvaita ===
Ramanuja's Vishishtadvaita school and Shankara's Advaita school are both nondualism Vedānta schools, both are premised on the assumption that all Selfs can hope for and achieve the state of blissful liberation; in contrast, Madhvacharya and his Dvaita subschool of Vedānta believed that some Selfs are eternally doomed and damned. Shankara's theory posits that only Brahman and causes are metaphysical unchanging reality, while the empirical world (Maya) and observed effects are changing, illusive and of relative existence. Spiritual liberation to Shankara is the full comprehension and realization of oneness of one's unchanging Atman (Self) as the same as Atman in everyone else as well as being identical to the nirguna Brahman. In contrast, Ramanuja's theory posits both Brahman and the world of matter are two different absolutes, both metaphysically real, neither should be called false or illusive, and saguna Brahman with attributes is also real. God, like man, states Ramanuja, has both soul and body, and all of the world of matter is the glory of God's body. The path to Brahman (Vishnu), asserted Ramanuja, is devotion to godliness and constant remembrance of the beauty and love of personal god (saguna Brahman, Vishnu), one which ultimately leads one to the oneness with nirguna Brahman.

=== Shuddhadvaita ===
Vallabhacharya (1479–1531 CE), the proponent of the philosophy of Shuddhadvaita Brahmvad enunciates that Ishvara has created the world without connection with any external agency such as Maya (which itself is his power) and manifests Himself through the world. That is why shuddhadvaita is known as 'Unmodified transformation' or 'Avikṛta Pariṇāmavāda'. Brahman or Ishvara desired to become many, and he became the multitude of individual Selfs and the world. Vallabha recognises Brahman as the whole and the individual as a 'part' (but devoid of bliss).

=== Dvaita ===
Madhvacharya was also a critic of Advaita Vedānta. Advaita's nondualism asserted that Atman (Self) and Brahman are identical (both in bondage and liberation), there is interconnected oneness of all Selfs and Brahman, and there are no pluralities. Madhva in contrast asserted that Atman (Self) and Brahman are different (both in bondage and liberation), only Vishnu is the Lord (Brahman), individual Selfs are also different and depend on Vishnu, and there are pluralities. Madhvacharya stated that both Advaita Vedānta and Mahayana Buddhism were a nihilistic school of thought. Madhvacharya wrote four major texts, including Upadhikhandana and Tattvadyota, primarily dedicated to criticizing Advaita.

Followers of ISKCON are highly critical of Advaita Vedānta, regarding it as māyāvāda, identical to Mahayana Buddhism. (Note: Gaura Gopala Dasa, The Self-Defeating Philosophy of Mayavada)

=== Influence on other traditions ===
Within the ancient and medieval texts of Hindu traditions, such as Vaishnavism, Shaivism and Shaktism, the ideas of Advaita Vedānta have had a major influence. (Note: Scholars are divided on the historical influence of Advaita Vedānta. Some Indologists state that it is one of the most studied Hindu philosophy and the most influential schools of classical Indian thought: Indich 2000, pp. 57–60; Brannigan 2009, p. 19: "Advaita Vedanta is the most influential philosophical system in Hindu thought."; Deutsch 1969, p. 3: "[Advaita Vedānta] has been and continues to be the most widely accepted system of thought among philosophers in India, and it is, we believe, one of the greatest philosophical achievements to be found in the East or the West.") Advaita Vedānta influenced Krishna Vaishnavism in the different parts of India. One of its most popular text, the Bhagavata Purana, adopts and integrates in Advaita Vedānta philosophy. The Bhagavata Purana is generally accepted by scholars to have been composed in the second half of 1st millennium CE.

In the ancient and medieval literature of Shaivism, called the Āgamas, the influence of Advaita Vedānta is once again prominent. Of the 92 Āgamas, ten are Dvaita texts, eighteen are Bhedabheda, and sixty-four are Advaita texts. According to Natalia Isaeva, there is an evident and natural link between 6th-century Gaudapada's Advaita Vedānta ideas and Kashmir Shaivism.

Shaktism, the Hindu tradition where a goddess is considered identical to Brahman, has similarly flowered from a syncretism of the monist premises of Advaita Vedānta and dualism premises of Samkhya–Yoga school of Hindu philosophy, sometimes referred to as Shaktadavaitavada (literally, the path of nondualistic Shakti).

Other influential ancient and medieval classical texts of Hinduism such as the Yoga Yajnavalkya, Yoga Vashishta, Avadhuta Gitā, Markandeya Purana and Sannyasa Upanishads predominantly incorporate premises and ideas of Advaita Vedānta.

== History of Advaita Vedānta ==
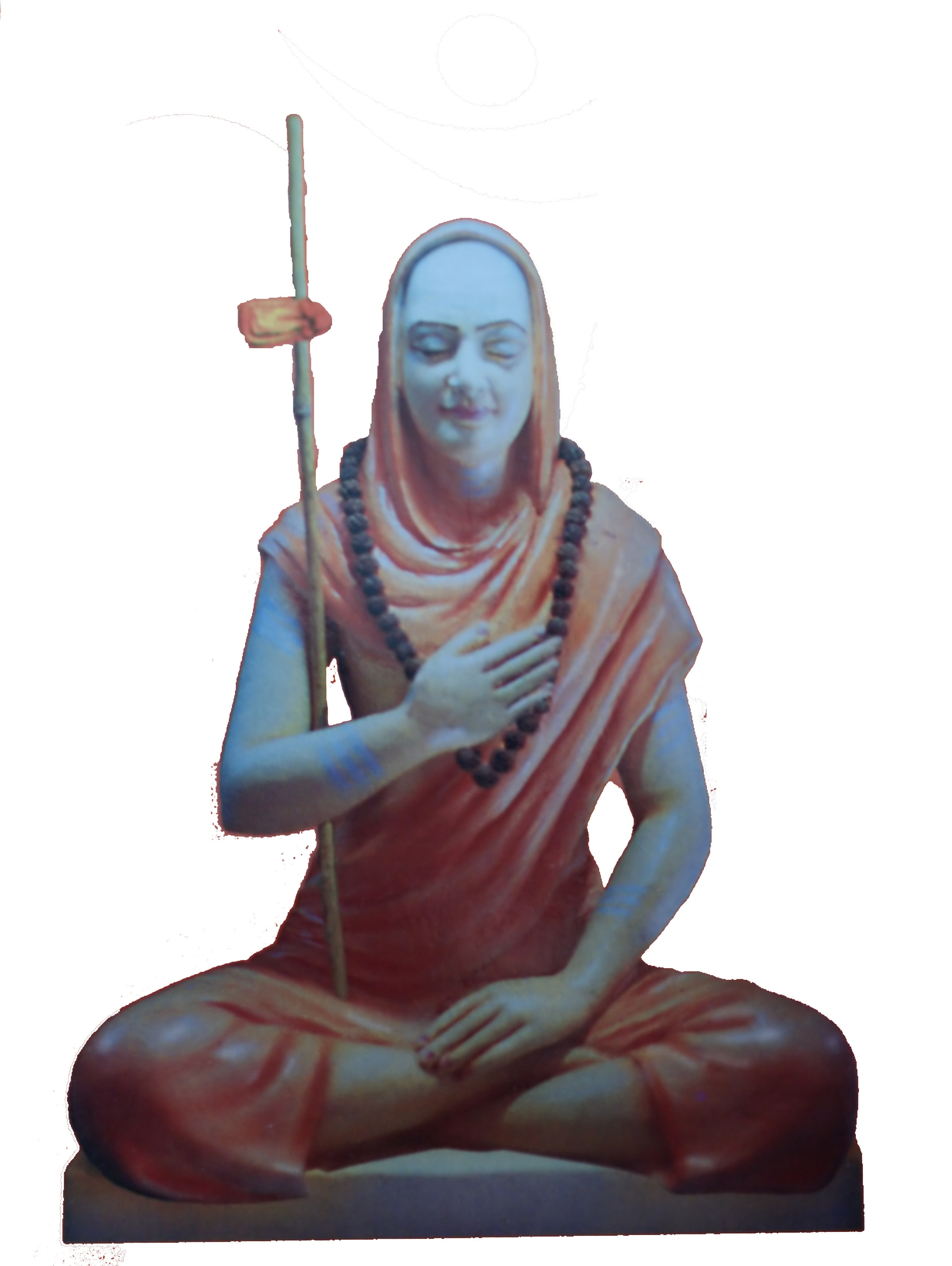
Gaudapada, one of the most important pre-Śaṅkara philosophers in Advaita tradition

=== Historiography ===
The historiography of Advaita Vedanta is coloured by Orientalist notions, (Note: In the Orientalist view, the medieval Muslim period was a time of stagnation and cultural degeneration, in which the original purity of the Upanisadic teachings, systematized by philosophers like Shankara, was lost. In this view, "the genuine achievements of Indian civilization" were recovered during the British colonial rule of India, due to the efforts of western Indologists, who viewed Advaita Vedanta as the authentic philosophy of the Upanishads, and Shankara as its greatest exponent. (Note: See also Devdutt Pattanaik (30 August 2020), Who is a Hindu? – What they don't tell you about Advaita Archived 19 December 2021 at the Wayback Machine, Mumbai Mirror.) While this view has been criticised by postcolonial studies and critiques of Orientalism, "in some corners of the academy, the Orientalists' understanding of premodern Indian history has so far escaped thorough reexamination.") while modern formulations of Advaita Vedānta, which developed as a reaction to western Orientalism and Perennialism have "become a dominant force in Indian intellectual thought." According to Michael S. Allen and Anand Venkatkrishnan, "scholars have yet to provide even a rudimentary, let alone comprehensive account of the history of Advaita Vedānta in the centuries leading up to the colonial period."

=== Early Vedānta ===
The Upanishads form the basic texts, of which Vedānta gives an interpretation. The Upanishads do not contain "a rigorous philosophical inquiry identifying the doctrines and formulating the supporting arguments". (Note: Nevertheless, Balasubramanian argues that since the basic ideas of the Vedanta systems are derived from the Vedas, the Vedantic philosophy is as old as the Vedas.) This philosophical inquiry was performed by the darsanas, the various philosophical schools. (Note: Deutsch and Dalvi point out that, in the Indian context, texts "are only part of a tradition which is preserved in its purest form in the oral transmission as it has been going on.")

The Brahma Sutras of Bādarāyana, also called the Vedānta Sutra, were compiled in its present form around 400–450 CE, but "the great part of the Sutra must have been in existence much earlier than that". Estimates of the date of Bādarāyana's lifetime differ between 200 BCE and 200 CE. The Brahma Sutra is a critical study of the teachings of the Upanishads, possibly "written from a Bhedābheda Vedāntic viewpoint". Bādarāyana was not the first person to systematise the teachings of the Upanishads. He refers to seven Vedantic teachers before him.

=== Early Advaita Vedānta ===
Two Advaita writings predating Maṇḍana Miśra and Shankara were known to scholars such as Nakamura in the first half of 20th-century, namely the Vākyapadīya, written by Bhartṛhari (second half 5th century), and the Māndūkya-kārikā written by Gauḍapāda (7th century). Later scholarship added the Sannyasa Upanishads (first centuries CE) to the earliest known corpus, some of which are of a sectarian nature, and have a strong Advaita Vedānta outlook.

According to Nakamura, "there must have been an enormous number of other writings turned out in this period [between the Brahma Sutras and Shankara], but unfortunately all of them have been scattered or lost and have not come down to us today". In his commentaries, Shankara mentions 99 different predecessors of his Sampradaya. In the beginning of his commentary on the Brhadaranyaka Upanishad Shankara salutes the teachers of the Brahmavidya Sampradaya. Pre-Shankara doctrines and sayings can be traced in the works of the later schools, which does give insight into the development of early Vedānta philosophy.

==== Gauḍapāda and Māṇḍukya Kārikā ====
According to tradition, Gauḍapāda (6th century) was the teacher of Govinda Bhagavatpada and the grandteacher of Shankara. Gauḍapāda wrote or compiled the Māṇḍukya Kārikā, also known as the Gauḍapāda Kārikā or the Āgama Śāstra. The Māṇḍukya Kārikā is a commentary in verse form on the Māṇḍūkya Upanishad, one of the shortest Upanishads consisting of just 13 prose sentences. Of the ancient literature related to Advaita Vedānta, the oldest surviving complete text is the Māṇḍukya Kārikā. The Māṇḍūkya Upanishad was considered to be a Śruti before the era of Adi Shankara, but not treated as particularly important. In later post-Shankara period its value became far more important, and regarded as expressing the essence of the Upanishad philosophy. The entire Karika became a key text for the Advaita school in this later era. (Note: Nakamura notes that there are contradictions in doctrine between the four chapters.)

Gaudapada took over the Yogachara teaching of vijñapti-mātra, "representation-only", which states that the empirical reality that we experience is a fabrication of the mind, experienced by consciousness-an-sich, (Note: It is often used interchangeably with the term citta-mātra, but they have different meanings. The standard translation of both terms is "consciousness-only" or "mind-only." Several modern researchers object this translation, and the accompanying label of "absolute idealism" or "idealistic monism". A better translation for vijñapti-mātra is representation-only.) and the four-cornered negation, which negates any positive predicates of 'the Absolute'. (Note: 1. Something is. 2. It is not. 3. It both is and is not. 4. It neither is nor is not. The 'four-cornered negation' is an English gloss of the Sanskrit, Chatushkoti.) Gaudapada "wove [both doctrines] into the philosophy of Mandukaya Upanisad, which was further developed by Shankara". (Note: The influence of Mahayana Buddhism on other religions and philosophies was not limited to Vedanta. Kalupahana notes that the Visuddhimagga – a Theravada Buddhist tradition, contains "some metaphysical speculations, such as those of the Sarvastivadins, the Sautrantikas, and even the Yogacarins".) In this view,

the ultimate ontological reality is the pure consciousness, which is bereft of attributes and intentionality. The world of duality is nothing but a vibration of the mind (manodṛśya or manaspandita). The pluralistic world is imagined by the mind (saṁkalpa) and this false projection is sponsored by the illusory factor called māyā. (Note: Gaudapada Archived 15 June 2020 at the Wayback Machine, Devanathan Jagannathan, University of Toronto, IEP)

Gauḍapāda uses the concepts of Ajātivāda to explain that 'the Absolute' is not subject to birth, change and death. The Absolute is aja, the unborn eternal. The empirical world of appearances is considered unreal, and not absolutely existent.

=== Early medieval period – Maṇḍana Miśra and Adi Shankara ===
==== Maṇḍana Miśra ====
Maṇḍana Miśra, an older contemporary of Shankara, was a Mimamsa scholar and a follower of Kumarila, but also wrote a seminal text on Advaita that has survived into the modern era, the Brahma-siddhi. According to Fiordalis, he was influenced by the Yoga-tradition, and with that indirectly by Buddhism, given the strong influence of Buddhism on the Yoga-tradition. For a couple of centuries he seems to have been regarded as "the most important representative of the Advaita position", (Note: King 2002, p. 128: "Although it is common to find Western scholars and Hindus arguing that Sankaracarya was the most influential and important figure in the history of Hindu intellectual thought, this does not seem to be justified by the historical evidence.") and the "theory of error" set forth in the Brahma-siddhi became the normative Advaita Vedanta theory of error.

==== Adi Shankara ====
Very little is known about Shankara. According to Dalal, "Hagiographical accounts of his life, the Śaṅkaravijayas ("Conquests of Śaṅkara"), were composed several centuries after his death", in the 14th to 17th century, and established Shankara as a rallying symbol of values in a time when most of India was conquered by Muslims. He is often considered to be the founder of the Advaita Vedānta school, but was actually a systematizer, not a founder.

===== Systematizer of Advaita thought =====
Shankara was a scholar who synthesized and systematized Advaita-vāda thought which already existed at his lifetime. According to Nakamura, comparison of the known teachings of the early Vedantins and Shankara's thought shows that most of the characteristics of Shankara's thought "were advocated by someone before Śankara". According to Nakamura, after the growing influence of Buddhism on Vedānta, culminating in the works of Gauḍapāda, Adi Shankara gave a Vedantic character to the Buddhistic elements in these works, synthesising and rejuvenating the doctrine of Advaita. According to Koller, using ideas in ancient Indian texts, Shankara systematized the foundation for Advaita Vedānta in the 8th century, reforming Badarayana's Vedānta tradition. According to Mayeda, Shankara represents a turning point in the development of Vedānta, yet he also notices that it is only since Deussens's praise that Shankara "has usually been regarded as the greatest philosopher of India." Mayeda further notes that Shankara was primarily concerned with moksha, "and not with the establishment of a complete system of philosophy or theology", following Potter, who qualifies Shankara as a "speculative philosopher". Lipner notes that Shankara's "main literary approach was commentarial and hence perforce disjointed rather than procedurally systematic [...] though a systematic philosophy can be derived from Samkara's thought."

===== Writings =====
Adi Shankara is best known for his reviews and commentaries (Bhasyas) on ancient Indian texts. His Brahmasutrabhasya (literally, commentary on Brahma Sutra) is a fundamental text of the Vedānta school of Hinduism. His commentaries on ten Mukhya (principal) Upanishads are also considered authentic by scholars. Other authentic works of Shankara include commentaries on the Bhagavad Gitā (part of his Prasthana Trayi Bhasya). He also authored Upadesasahasri, his most important original philosophical work. The authenticity of Shankara being the author of Vivekacūḍāmaṇi has been questioned, and "modern scholars tend to reject its authenticity as a work by Shankara."

===== Influence of Shankara =====
While Shankara has an unparalleled status in the history of Advaita Vedanta, scholars have questioned the traditional narrative of Shankara's early influence in India. Until the 10th century Shankara was overshadowed by his older contemporary Maṇḍana Miśra, who was considered to be the major representative of Advaita. Only when Vacaspati Misra, an influential student of Maṇḍana Miśra, harmonised the teachings of Shankara with those of Maṇḍana Miśra, Shankara's teachings gained prominence. Some modern Advaitins argue that most of post-Shankara Advaita Vedanta actually deviates from Shankara, and that only his student Suresvara, who's had little influence, represents Shankara correctly. In this view, Shankara's influential student Padmapada misunderstood Shankara, while his views were maintained by the Suresvara school. According to Satchidanandendra Sarasvati, "almost all the later Advaitins were influenced by Mandana Misra and Bhaskara." Until the 11th century, Vedanta itself was a peripheral school of thought; Vedanta became a major influence when Vedanta philosophy was utilized by various sects of Hinduism to ground their doctrines, such as Ramanuja (11th c.), who aligned bhakti, "the major force in the religions of Hinduism", with philosophical thought, meanwhile rejecting Shankara's views. (Note: Encyclopædia Britannica, Ramanajua)

The cultural influence of Shankara and Advaita Vedanta started only centuries later, in the Vijayanagara Empire in the 14th century, when Sringeri matha started to receive patronage from the kings of the Vijayanagara Empire and became a powerful institution. Vidyaranya, also known as Madhava, who was the Jagadguru of the Śringeri Śarada Pītham from c. 1374–1380 to 1386 played a central role in this growing influence of Advaita Vedanta, and the deification of Shankara as a ruler-renunciate. From 1346 onwards Sringeri matha received patronage from the Vijayanagara kings, and its importance and influence grew rapidly in the second half of the 14th century. (Note: The insignificance of Srineri matha before this time was such, that Hacker and Kulke & Rothermund have argued that Sringeri matha may have been founded by Vidyaranya himself, proclaiming that it was established by Shankara himself.) Vidyaranya and the Sringeri matha competed for royal patronage and converts with Srivaisnava Visistadvaita, which was dominant in territories conquered by the Vijayanagara Empire, and Madhava (the pre-ordination name of Vidyaranya) presented Shankara's teachings as the summit of all darsanas, portraying the other darsanas as partial truths which converged in Shankara's teachings. The subsequent Shankara Digvijayam genre, following the example of the earlier Madhva Digvijayam, presented Shankara as a ruler-renunciate, conquering the four quarters of India and bringing harmony. The genre created legends to turn Shankara into a "divine folk-hero who spread his teaching through his digvijaya ("universal conquest") all over India like a victorious conqueror."

Shankara's position was further established in the 19th and 20th century, when neo-Vedantins and western Orientalists, following Vidyaranya, elevated Advaita Vedanta "as the connecting theological thread that united Hinduism into a single religious tradition." Shankara became "an iconic representation of Hindu religion and culture", despite the fact that most Hindus do not adhere to Advaita Vedanta.

==== Advaita Vedanta sub-schools ====
Two defunct schools are the Pancapadika and Istasiddhi, which were replaced by Prakasatman's Vivarana school. The still existing Bhāmatī and Vivarana developed in the 11th–14th century. These schools worked out the logical implications of various Advaita doctrines. Two of the problems they encountered were the further interpretations of the concepts of māyā and avidya.

Padmapada (c. 800 CE), the founder of the defunct Pancapadika school, was a direct disciple of Shankara. He wrote the Pancapadika, a commentary on the Sankara-bhaya. Padmapada diverged from Shankara in his description of avidya, designating prakrti as avidya or ajnana.

Sureśvara (fl. 800–900 CE) was a contemporary of Shankara, and often (incorrectly) identified with Maṇḍana Miśra. (Note: Potter 2008, pp. 346–347, 420–423: "There is little firm historical information about Suresvara; tradition holds Suresvara is same as Mandanamisra.") Sureśvara has also been credited as the founder of a pre-Shankara branch of Advaita Vedānta.

Mandana Mishra's student Vachaspati Miśra (9th/10th century CE), who is believed to have been an incarnation of Shankara to popularize the Advaita view, wrote the Bhamati, a commentary on Shankara's Brahma Sutra Bhashya, and the Brahmatattva-samiksa, a commentary on Mandana Mishra's Brahma-siddhi. His thought was mainly inspired by Mandana Miśra, and harmonises Shankara's thought with that of Mandana Miśra. The Bhamati school takes an ontological approach. It sees the Jiva as the source of avidya. It sees contemplation as the main factor in the acquirement of liberation, while the study of the Vedas and reflection are additional factors.

Vimuktatman (c. 1200 CE) wrote the Ista-siddhi. It is one of the four traditional siddhi, together with Mandana's Brahma-siddhi, Suresvara's Naiskarmya-siddhi, and Madusudana's Advaita-siddhi. According to Vimuktatman, absolute Reality is "pure intuitive consciousness". His school of thought was eventually replaced by Prakasatman's Vivarana school.

Prakasatman (c. 1200–1300) wrote the Pancapadika-Vivarana, a commentary on the Pancapadika by Padmapadacharya. The Vivarana lends its name to the subsequent school. According to Roodurmun, "[H]is line of thought [...] became the leitmotif of all subsequent developments in the evolution of the Advaita tradition." The Vivarana school takes an epistemological approach. It is distinguished from the Bhamati school by its rejection of action and favouring Vedic study and "a direct apprehension of Brahma". Prakasatman was the first to propound the theory of mulavidya or maya as being of "positive beginningless nature", and sees Brahman as the source of avidya. Critics object that Brahman is pure consciousness, so it cannot be the source of avidya. Another problem is that contradictory qualities, namely knowledge and ignorance, are attributed to Brahman.

Another late figure which is widely associated with Advaita and was influential on late Advaita thought was Śrīharṣa.

=== Late medieval India – yogic Advaita ===
Michael S. Allen and Anand Venkatkrishnan note that Shankara is very well-studied, but "scholars have yet to provide even a rudimentary, let alone comprehensive account of the history of Advaita Vedānta in the centuries leading up to the colonial period."

While indologists like Paul Hacker and Wilhelm Halbfass took Shankara's system as the measure for an "orthodox" Advaita Vedānta, the living Advaita Vedānta tradition in medieval times was influenced by, and incorporated elements from, the yogic tradition and texts like the Yoga Vasistha and the Bhagavata Purana. Yoga and samkhya had become minor schools of thought since the time of Shankara, and no longer posed a thread for the sectarian identity of Advaita, in contrast to the Vaishnava traditions.

The Yoga Vasistha became an authoritative source text in the Advaita vedānta tradition in the 14th century, and the "yogic Advaita" of Vidyāraņya's Jivanmuktiviveka (14th century) was influenced by the (Laghu-)Yoga-Vasistha, which in turn was influenced by Kashmir Shaivism. Vivekananda's 19th century emphasis on nirvikalpa samadhi was preceded by medieval yogic influences on Advaita Vedānta. In the 16th and 17th centuries, some Nath and hatha yoga texts also came within the scope of the developing Advaita Vedānta tradition.

According to Andrew Nicholson, it was with the arrival of Islamic rule, first in the form of Delhi Sultanate and later the Mughal Empire, and the subsequent persecution of Indian religions, that Hindu scholars began a self-conscious attempts to define an identity and unity. Between the twelfth and the fourteenth century, this effort emerged with the "astika and nastika" schema of classifying Indian philosophy.

==== Vidyāraṇya ====
It is only during this period that the historical fame and cultural influence of Shankara and Advaita Vedanta was established. Advaita Vedanta's position as most influential Hindu darsana took shape as Advaitins in the Vijayanagara Empire competed for patronage from the royal court, and tried to convert others to their sect. Sringeri matha started to receive patronage from the kings of the Vijayanagara Empire who shifted their allegiance from Advaitic Agamic Shaivism to Brahmanical Advaita orthodoxy.

Central in this repositioning was Vidyāraṇya, also known as Madhava, who was the Jagadguru of the Śringeri Śarada Pītham from 1380 to 1386 and a minister in the Vijayanagara Empire. He inspired the re-creation of the Hindu Vijayanagara Empire of South India, in response to the devastation caused by the Islamic Delhi Sultanate, but his efforts were also targeted at Srivaisnava groups, especially Visistadvaita, which was dominant in territories conquered by the Vijayanagara Empire. Sects competed for patronage from the royal court, and tried to convert others to their own sectarian system, and Vidyaranya efforts were aimed at promoting Advaita Vedanta. Most of Shankara's biographies were created and published from the 14th to the 17th century, such as the widely cited Śankara-vijaya, in which legends were created to turn Shankara into a "divine folk-hero who spread his teaching through his digvijaya ("universal conquest") all over India like a victorious conqueror."

Vidyaranya and his brothers wrote extensive Advaitic commentaries on the Vedas and Dharma to make "the authoritative literature of the Aryan religion" more accessible. In his doxography Sarvadarśanasaṅgraha ("Summary of all views") Vidyaranya presented Shankara's teachings as the summit of all darsanas, presenting the other darsanas as partial truths which converged in Shankara's teachings, which was regarded to be the most inclusive system. The Vaishanava traditions of Dvaita and Visitadvaita were not classified as Vedanta, and placed just above Buddhism and Jainism, reflecting the threat they posed for Vidyaranya's Advaita allegiance. Bhedabheda was not mentioned at all, "literally written out of the history of Indian philosophy." Vidyaranya became head of Sringeri matha, proclaiming that it was established by Shankara himself. Vidyaranya enjoyed royal support, and his sponsorship and methodical efforts helped establish Shankara as a rallying symbol of values, spread historical and cultural influence of Shankara's Vedānta philosophies, and establish monasteries (mathas) to expand the cultural influence of Shankara and Advaita Vedānta.

=== Modern Advaita ===
==== Niścaldās and "Greater" Advaita ====
Michael S. Allen has written on the influence and popularity of Advaita Vedanta in early modern north India, especially on the work of the Advaita Dādū-panthī monk Niścaldās (c. 1791–1863), author of The Ocean of Inquiry (Hindi: Vichāra-sāgara), a vernacular compendium of Advaita. According to Allen, the work of Niścaldās "was quite popular in the late nineteenth and early twentieth centuries: it was translated into over eight languages and was once referred to by Vivekananda as having 'more influence in India than any [book] that has been written in any language within the last three centuries.'"

Allen highlights the widespread prominence in early modern India of what he calls "Greater Advaita Vedānta" which refers to popular Advaita works, including "narratives and dramas, 'eclectic' works blending Vedānta with other traditions, and vernacular works such as The Ocean of Inquiry." Allen refers to several popular late figures and texts which draw on Advaita Vedanta, such as the Maharashtrian sant Eknāth (16th c.), the popular Adhyātma-rāmāyaṇa (c. late 15th c.), which synthesizes Rama bhakti and advaita metaphysics and the Tripurā-rahasya (a tantric text that adopts an advaita metaphysics). Other important vernacular Advaita figures include the Hindu authors Manohardās and Māṇakdās (who wrote the Ātma-bodh). Advaita literature was also written in Tamil, Telugu, Malayalam, Kannada, Marathi, Gujarati, Hindi, Punjabi, Bengali, and Oriya.

==== Neo-Vedanta ====
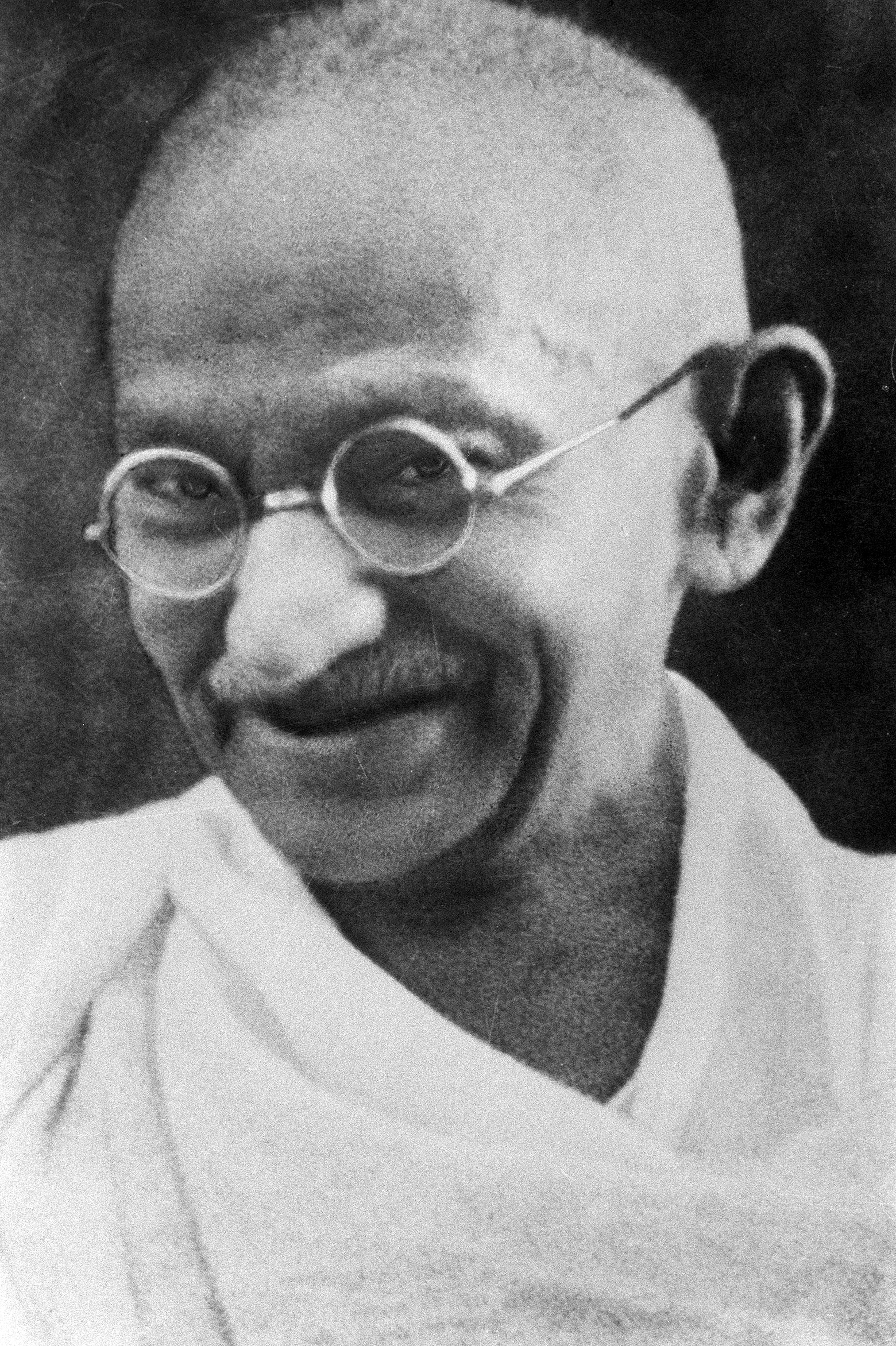
Mahatma Gandhi stated "I am an advaitist".

According to King, with the consolidation of the British imperialist rule the new rulers started to view Indians through the "colonially crafted lenses" of Orientalism. In response Hindu nationalism emerged, striving for socio-political independence and countering the influence of Christian missionaries. Among the colonial era intelligentsia the monistic Advaita Vedānta has been a major ideological force for Hindu nationalism, with Hindu intellectuals formulating a "humanistic, inclusivist" response, now called Neo-Vedānta, attempting to respond to this colonial stereotyping of "Indian culture [as] backward, superstitious and inferior to the West."

Due to the influence of Vidyaranya's Sarvadarśanasaṅgraha, early Indologists regarded Advaita Vedanta as the most accurate interpretation of the Upanishads. Vedānta came to be regarded, both by westerners as by Indian nationalists, as the essence of Hinduism, and Advaita Vedānta came to be regarded as "then paradigmatic example of the mystical nature of the Hindu religion" and umbrella of "inclusivism". Colonial era Indian thinkers, such as Vivekananda, presented Advaita Vedānta as an inclusive universal religion, a spirituality that in part helped organize a religiously infused identity. It also aided the rise of Hindu nationalism as a counter weight to Islam-infused Muslim communitarian organizations such as the Muslim League, to Christianity-infused colonial orientalism and to religious persecution of those belonging to Indian religions. Neo-Vedānta subsumed and incorporated Buddhist ideas thereby making the Buddha a part of the Vedānta tradition, all in an attempt to reposition the history of Indian culture. This view on Advaita Vedānta, according to King, "provided an opportunity for the construction of a nationalist ideology that could unite Hindus in their struggle against colonial oppression".

Vivekananda discerned a universal religion, regarding all the apparent differences between various traditions as various manifestations of one truth. Vivekananda emphasised nirvikalpa samadhi as the spiritual goal of Vedānta, he equated it to the liberation in Yoga and encouraged Yoga practice which he called Raja yoga. (Note: According to Comans, this approach is missing in historic Advaita texts.) With the efforts of Vivekananda, modern formulations of Advaita Vedānta have "become a dominant force in Indian intellectual thought", though Hindu beliefs and practices are diverse.

Sarvepalli Radhakrishnan, first a professor at Oxford University and later a President of India, further popularized Advaita Vedānta, presenting it as the essence of Hinduism. According to Michael Hawley, Radhakrishnan saw other religions, as well as "what Radhakrishnan understands as lower forms of Hinduism", as interpretations of Advaita Vedānta, thereby "in a sense Hindusizing all religions". Radhakrishnan metaphysics was grounded in Advaita Vedānta, but he reinterpreted Advaita Vedānta for contemporary needs and context. (Note: Neo-Vedanta seems to be closer to Bhedabheda-Vedanta than to Shankara's Advaita Vedanta, with the acknowledgement of the reality of the world. Nicholas F. Gier: "Ramakrsna, Svami Vivekananda, and Aurobindo (I also include M.K. Gandhi) have been labeled "neo-Vedantists," a philosophy that rejects the Advaitins' claim that the world is illusory. Aurobindo, in his The Life Divine, declares that he has moved from Sankara's "universal illusionism" to his own "universal realism" (2005: 432), defined as metaphysical realism in the European philosophical sense of the term.")

Mahatma Gandhi declared his allegiance to Advaita Vedānta, and was another popularizing force for its ideas.

==== Contemporary Advaita Vedānta ====
Contemporary teachers are the orthodox Jagadguru of Sringeri Sharada Peetham; the more traditional teachers Sivananda Saraswati (1887–1963), Chinmayananda Saraswati (1916–1993), Dayananda Saraswati (Arsha Vidya) (1930–2015), Swami Paramarthananda, Swami Tattvavidananda Sarasvati, Carol Whitfield (Radha), Sri Vasudevacharya (previously Michael Comans) and less traditional teachers such as Narayana Guru. According to Sangeetha Menon, prominent names in 20th century Advaita tradition are Shri Chandrashekhara Bharati Mahaswami, Chandrasekharendra Saraswati Swamigal, Sacchidānandendra Saraswati.

==== Influence on new religious movements ====
Advaita Vedānta has gained attention in western spirituality and New Age as nondualism, where various traditions are seen as driven by the same non-dual experience. Nonduality points to "a primordial, natural awareness without subject or object". It is also used to refer to interconnectedness, "the sense that all things are interconnected and not separate, while at the same time all things retain their individuality".

Neo-Advaita is a new religious movement based on a popularised, western interpretation of Advaita Vedānta and the teachings of Ramana Maharshi. Notable neo-advaita teachers are H. W. L. Poonja, his students Gangaji Andrew Cohen (Note: Presently Cohen has distanced himself from Poonja, and calls his teachings "Evolutionary Enlightenment". What Is Enlightenment, the magazine published by Choen's organisation, has been critical of neo-Advaita several times, as early as 2001. See. (Note: What is Enlightenment? 1 September 2006) (Note: What is Enlightenment? 1 December 2005)), and Eckhart Tolle.

== See also ==
- Kashmir Shaivism
- Pandeism
- Pantheism
- Panentheism
- Aham Brahmasmi
- Ubhay Bharati
- Acharya Prashant

== Sources ==
Printed sources

- Aiyar, K.N. (Transl. (1914), Thirty Minor Upanishads
- Allen, Michael S. (2 October 2017). "Greater Advaita Vedānta: The Case of Niścaldās". International Journal of Hindu Studies. 21 (3): 275–297. doi:10.1007/s11407-017-9214-0. S2CID 171944554.
- Allen, Michael S.; Venkatkrishnan, Anand (25 September 2017). "Introduction to Special Issue: New Directions in the Study of Advaita Vedānta". International Journal of Hindu Studies. 21 (3): 271–274. doi:10.1007/s11407-017-9218-9.
- Arapura, John (1986). Hermeneutical Essays on Vedāntic Topics. Motilal Banarsidass. ISBN 978-8120801837.
- Bādarāyaṇa (1936). Brahmasutra-bhasya 1.1.4 (PDF). Translated by S. Vireswarananda. Archived (PDF) from the original on 29 September 2021.
- Bader, Jonathan (2001), Conquest of the Four Quarters. TYraditional Accounts of the Life of Shankara, Australian National University
- Baird, Robert D. (1986), "Swami Bhativedanta and the Bhagavd Gita As It Is", in Minor, Robert Neil (ed.), Modern Indian Interpreters of the Bhagavad Gita, SUNY Press
- Balasubramanian, R. (2000). "Introduction". In Chattopadhyana (ed.). History of Science, Philosophy and Culture in Indian Civilization. Volume II Part 2: Advaita Vedanta. Delhi: Centre for Studies in Civilizations.
- Barua, Ankur (2015), "Ideas of Liberation in Medieval Advaita Vedānta", Religion Compass, 9 (8): 262–271, doi:10.1111/rec3.12160
- Belling, Noa (2006). Yoga for ideal weight and shape. Sydney, Australia: New Holland Publishers (Australia) P/L. ISBN 978-1-74110-298-7.
- Bhatawadekar, Sai (2013), "The Tvat Tam Asi Formula and Schopenhauer's "Deductive Leap"", in Fuechtner, Veronika; Rhiel, Mary (eds.), Imagining Germany Imagining Asia: Essays in Asian-German Studies, Boydell & Brewer
- Bhattacharya, Vidhushekhara (1943). Gauḍapādakārikā. Delhi: Motilal Banarsidass.
- Biderman, Shlomo (1978). "Śankara and the Buddhists". Journal of Indian Philosophy. 6 (4). doi:10.1007/BF00218430. S2CID 170754201.
- Black, Brian (2012), The Character of the Self in Ancient India: Priests, Kings, and Women in the Early Upanisads, SUNY, ISBN 9780791480526, archived from the original on 16 January 2024
- Blake Michael, R. (1992), The Origins of Vīraśaiva Sects, Motilal Banarsidass, ISBN 978-81-208-0776-1
- Bowker, John (2000a), "Advaita Vedanta", The Concise Oxford Dictionary of World Religions, Oxford University Press, ISBN 978-0-19-280094-7, archived from the original on 5 January 2022
- Bowker, John (2000b), "Anubhava", The Concise Oxford Dictionary of World Religions, Oxford University Press, ISBN 978-0-19-280094-7, archived from the original on 2 January 2022
- Bowker, John (2000c), "Atman", The Concise Oxford Dictionary of World Religions, Oxford University Press, ISBN 978-0-19-280094-7
- Bowker, John (2003), "Brahman", The Oxford Dictionary of World Religions, Oxford University Press, ISBN 978-0-19-280094-7, archived from the original on 4 January 2022
- Brannigan, Michael (2009), Striking a Balance: A Primer in Traditional Asian Values, Rowman & Littlefield, Rowman & Littlefield, ISBN 978-0739138465
- Braue, Donald A. (1984), Māyā in Radhakrishnanʾs Thought: Six Meanings Other Than Illusion, Motilall Banarsidass
- Brereton, Joel P. (1986), ""Tat Tvam Ast" in Context", Zeitschrift der Deutschen Morgenländischen Gesellschaft, 136 (1): 98–109
- Brodd, Jeffrey (2003). World Religions. Winona, MN: Saint Mary's Press. ISBN 978-0-88489-725-5.
- Brodd, Jeffrey (2009), World Religions: A Voyage of Discovery, Saint Mary's Press, ISBN 978-0884899976
- Brooks, Douglas Renfrew (1990). The Secret of the Three Cities: An Introduction to Hindu Shakta Tantrism. Chicago: The University of Chicago Press. ISBN 978-0-226-07569-3.
- Brown, C. Mackenzie (1983). "The Origin and Transmission of the Two "Bhāgavata Purāṇas": A Canonical and Theological Dilemma". Journal of the American Academy of Religion. 51 (4). Oxford University Press: 551–567. doi:10.1093/jaarel/li.4.551. JSTOR 1462581.
- Caplan, Mariana (2009), Eyes Wide Open: Cultivating Discernment on the Spiritual Path, Sounds True
- Cenkner, William (1995), A Tradition of Teachers: Śaṅkara and the Jagadgurus Today, Motilall Banarsidas
- Chapple, Christopher (1984). "Introduction". The Concise Yoga Vāsiṣṭha. Translated by S Venkatesananda. State University of New York Press. ISBN 0-87395-955-8. OCLC 11044869. Archived from the original on 16 March 2023.
- Chatterjea, Tara (2003), Knowledge and Freedom in Indian Philosophy, Lexington Books
- Clark, Matthew (2006), The Daśanāmī-Saṃnyāsīs: The Integration of Ascetic Lineages into an Order, BRILL
- Coburn, Thomas B. (1984). "'Scripture' in India: Towards a Typology of the Word in Hindu Life". Journal of the American Academy of Religion. 52 (3): 435–459. doi:10.1093/jaarel/52.3.435.
- Comans, Michael (2000), The Method of Early Advaita Vedānta: A Study of Gauḍapāda, Śaṅkara, Sureśvara, and Padmapāda, Delhi: Motilal Banarsidass
- Dalal, Neil (2009). "Contemplative Practice and Textual Agency in Advaita Vedanta". Method and Theory in the Study of Religion. 21: 15–27. doi:10.1163/157006809X416788.
- Dalal, Neil (2014). "Contemplative Grammars: Śaṅkara's Distinction of Upāsana and Nididhyāsana". Journal of Indian Philosophy. 44: 179–206. doi:10.1007/s10781-014-9258-z. S2CID 170638191.
- Dalal, R. (2011). The Religions of India: A Concise Guide to Nine Major Faiths. Penguin. ISBN 978-0143415176.
- Dandekar, R.N. (2005), "Vedanta", in Jones, Lindsay (ed.), MacMillan Encyclopedia of Religion, MacMillan
- Dasgupta, Surendranath (1955), A history of Indian philosophy. 5. Southern schools of ́Saivism, Volume 5, CUP Archive
- Dasgupta, Surendranath (1975), A history of Indian philosophy. Volume 2, Motilal Banarsidass Publ.
- Dasgupta, S.N. (1997). History of Indian Philosophy, Volume 1.
- Dasgupta, Sanghamitra; Mohanta, Dilip Kumar (1998), Indian Philosophical Quarterly, vol. XXV
- Datta, D.M. (1992) [1932], The Six Ways of Knowing: A Critical study of the Advaita theory of knowledge, University of Calcutta, Motilal Banarsidass Publishers Private Limited, pp. 221–253, ISBN 978-8120835269
- Davis, Leesa S. (2010), Advaita Vedānta and Zen Buddhism: Deconstructive Modes of Spiritual Inquiry, Continuum International Publishing Group
- Davis, Richard (2014), Ritual in an Oscillating Universe: Worshipping Siva in Medieval India, Princeton University Press, ISBN 978-0691603087
- Dense, Christian D. Von (1999), Philosophers and Religious Leaders, Greenwood Publishing Group
- Derrida, Jacques (25 August 1992). Derrida and Negative Theology. SUNY Press. ISBN 978-0-7914-0964-0. Archived from the original on 16 January 2024.
- Deussen, Paul (1980). Sixty Upaniṣads of the Veda, Volume 1. Motilal Banarsidass.
- Deutsch, Eliot (1969). Advaita Vedanta: A Philosophical Reconstruction. Honolulu: East-West Center Press.
  - Deutsch, Eliot (1973), Advaita Vedanta: A Philosophical Reconstruction, University of Hawaii Press, ISBN 978-0-8248-0271-4, archived from the original on 16 January 2024
  - Deutsch, Eliot (1980), Advaita Vedanta: A Philosophical Reconstruction, University of Hawaii Press, ISBN 978-0824802714
  - Deutsch, Eliot (1988), Advaita Vedanta: A Philosophical Reconstruction, University of Hawaii Press, ISBN 0-88706-662-3
- Deutsch, Eliott (2000), "Karma as a "Convenient Fiction" in the Advaita Vedanta", in Perrett, Roy (ed.), Indian Philosophy Vol. 4: Philosophy of Religion, Routledge, ISBN 978-0815336112
- Deutsch, Eliott (2013), "Karma as a "Convenient Fiction" in the Advaita Vedanta", in Perrett, Roy (ed.), Indian Philosophy Vol. 4: Philosophy of Religion, Routledge
- Deutsch, Eliot; Dalvi, Rohit (2004), The Essential Vedanta: A New Source Book of Advaita Vedanta, World Wisdom, Inc., ISBN 9780941532525, archived from the original on 16 January 2024
- Dhavamony, Mariasusai (2002). Hindu-Christian Dialogue: Theological Soundings and Perspectives. Rodopi Press. ISBN 978-9042015104.
- Doherty, Martha (2005), "A Contemporary Debate Among Advaita Vedantins on the Nature of Avidya", Journal of Indian Philosophy, 33 (2): 209–241, doi:10.1007/s10781-004-2599-2, S2CID 143714018
- Doniger, Wendy (1999), Merriam-Webster's Encyclopedia of World Religions, Merriam-Webster, ISBN 9780877790440, archived from the original on 2 July 2023
- Dubois, Joel Andre-Michel (2013), The Hidden Lives of Brahman, SUNY
- Dyczkowski, Mark (1989), The Canon of the Śaivāgama, Motilal Banarsidass Pvt. Ltd., ISBN 978-8120805958
- Fasching, Wolfgang (2011), "'I Am of the Nature of Seeing': Phenomenological Reflections on the Indian Notion of Witness-Consciousness", in Siderits, M.; Thompson, E.; Zahavi, D. (eds.), Self, No Self? Perspectives from Analytical, Phenomenological, and Indian Traditions, Oxford: Oxford University Press
- Fasching, Wolfgang (2021), "Prakāśa. A few reflections on the Advaitic understanding of consciousness as presence and its relevance for philosophy of mind", Phenomenology and the Cognitive Sciences, 20 (4), Springer: 679–701, doi:10.1007/s11097-020-09690-2, S2CID 225385862
- Fiordalis, David Vincent (2021), "One or None? Truth and Self-Transformation for Śaṅkara and Kamalaśīla", Religions, 12 (12): 1043, doi:10.3390/rel12121043
- Flood, Gavin (1996), An Introduction to Hinduism, Cambridge University Press, ISBN 978-0-521-43878-0
- Flood, Gavin; Olivelle, Patrick (2003). The Blackwell Companion to Hinduism. Blackwell.
- Fort, Andrew (1996), "Liberation While Living in the Jivanmuktiviveka: Vidrayana's "Yogic Advaita", in Fort, Andrew O.; Mumme, Patricia Y. (eds.), Living Liberation in Hindu Thought, SUNY
- Fort, Andrew (1998), Jivanmukti in Transformation: Embodied Liberation in Advaita and Neo-Vedanta, State University of New York Press, ISBN 978-0791439043
- Fost, Frederic F. (1998). "Playful Illusion: The Making of Worlds in Advaita Vedanta". Philosophy East and West. 48 (3). University of Hawai'i Press: 387–405. doi:10.2307/1400333. JSTOR 1400333.
- Fowler, Jeaneane D. (2002), Perspectives of Reality: An Introduction to the Philosophy of Hinduism, Sussex Academic Press, ISBN 978-1898723936
- Fowler, Merv (2005), Zen Buddhism: Beliefs and Practices, Sussex Academic Press
- Gambhirananda, Swami (2021) [1965], Brahma Sutra Bhasya of Sankaracarya, Advaita Ashrama Publication Department
- Ganeri, Jonardon (2019), Indian Philosophy: A Reader, Routledge, ISBN 9781000728033, archived from the original on 16 January 2024
- Garfield, Jay L.; Priest, Graham (2003), Nagarjuna and the Limits of Thought, Philosophy East & West Volume 53, Number 1 January 2003 1–21 (PDF), archived (PDF) from the original on 26 November 2018
- Gleig, Ann Louise (2011), Enlightenment After the Enlightenment: American Transformations of Asian Contemplative Traditions, ProQuest 885589248
- Goodall, Dominic (1996), Hindu Scriptures, University of California Press, University of California Press, ISBN 978-0520207783
- Goodding, Robert A. (2013), "A Theologian in a South Indian Kingdom: The Historical Context of the Jivanmuktiviveka of Vidyaranya", in Lindquist, Steven E. (ed.), Religion and Identity in South Asia and Beyond: Essays in Honor of Patrick Olivelle, Anthem Press
- Goswami Abhay Charan Bhaktivedanta (1956), Shri Krishna The Supreme 'Vedantist', archived from the original on 4 January 2022
- Grimes, John A. (1990), The Seven Great Untenables: Sapta-vidhā Anupapatti, Motilall Banarsidass
- Grimes, John (1994). Problems and Perspectives in Religious Discourse: Advaita Vedanta Implications. State University of New York Press. ISBN 978-0-7914-1791-1.
- Grimes, John A. (1996), A Concise Dictionary of Indian Philosophy: Sanskrit Terms Defined in English, SUNY Press, ISBN 978-0-7914-3067-5
- Grimes, John (1998), "Book reviews: Early Advaita Vedanta and Buddhism: The Mahayana Context of the Gaudapadiya-karika, by Richard King. SUNY Press (1995)", Journal of the American Academy of Religion, 66 (3): 684, doi:10.1093/jaarel/66.3.684
- Grimes, John (2004). The Vivekacūḍāmaṇi of Śaṅkarācārya Bhagavatpāda: An Introduction and Translation. Motilal Banarsidass. ISBN 978-81-208-2039-5.
- Gupta, Bina (1995). Perceiving in Advaita Vedānta: Epistemological Analysis and Interpretation. Motilal Banarsidass. ISBN 978-81-208-1296-3.
- Gupta, Bina (1998). The Disinterested Witness: A Fragment of Advaita Vedānta Phenomenology. Northwestern University Press. ISBN 978-0-8101-1565-1.
- Hacker, Paul (1995), Philology and Confrontation: Paul Hacker on Traditional and Modern Vedanta, SUNY Press, ISBN 978-0-7914-2582-4
- Halbfass, Wilhelm (2017), India and Europe: An Essay in Philosophical Understanding, Motilal Banarsidass
- Heim, M. (2005). "Chapter 35, Differentiations in Hindu ethics". In Schweiker, William (ed.). The Blackwell companion to religious ethics. Wiley. ISBN 0-631-21634-0.
- Hiltebeitel, Alf (2013). "Hinduism". In Kitagawa, Joseph (ed.). The Religious Traditions of Asia: Religion, History, and Culture. Routledge. ISBN 9781136875977. Archived from the original on 11 January 2023.
- Hiriyanna, M. (1993). Outlines of Indian Philosophy. Motilal Banarsidass. pp. 359–363. ISBN 978-81-208-1086-0.
- Hookham, S. K. (1991). The Buddha Within: Tathagatagarbha Doctrine According to the Shentong Interpretation of the Ratnagotravibhaga. State University of New York Press. ISBN 978-0-7914-0357-0. Archived from the original on 16 January 2024.
- Hume, Robert (1921). "Chandogya Upanishad". The Thirteen Principal Upanishads. Oxford University Press.
- Indich, William (2000), Consciousness in Advaita Vedanta, Motilal Banarsidass, ISBN 978-8120812512, archived from the original on 16 January 2024
- Ingalls, Daniel H. (1954), "Śaṁkara's arguments against the buddhists", Philosophy East and West, 3 (4): 291–306, doi:10.2307/1397287, JSTOR 1397287, archived from the original on 28 June 2011
- Isaeva, N.V. (1993), Shankara and Indian Philosophy, SUNY Press
- Isaeva, N.V. (1995), From Early Vedanta to Kashmir Shaivism: Gaudapada, Bhartrhari, and Abhinavagupta, SUNY Press
- Jacobs, Alan (2004), "Advaita and Western Neo-Advaita", The Mountain Path Journal, Ramanasramam: 81–88, archived from the original on 18 May 2015
- Jayatilleke, K.N. (1963), Early Buddhist Theory of Knowledge (PDF) (1st ed.), London: George Allen & Unwin Ltd., archived from the original (PDF) on 11 September 2015
- Johnson, W.J. (2009). "Atman (self)". A Dictionary of Hinduism. Oxford University Press. ISBN 978-0198610250.
- Jones, Constance; Ryan, James D. (2006). Encyclopedia of Hinduism. Infobase Publishing.
- Jones, Richard H. (2004). "Shankara's Advaita". Mysticism and Morality: A New Look at Old Questions. Lanham: Lexington Books. pp. 95–114.
- Kalupahana, David J. (1994), A history of Buddhist philosophy, Delhi: Motilal Banarsidass Publishers
- Kaplan, Stephen (April 2007). "Vidyā and Avidyā: Simultaneous and Coterminous?: A Holographic Model to Illuminate the Advaita Debate". Philosophy East and West. 2. 57 (2): 178–203. doi:10.1353/pew.2007.0019. JSTOR 4488090. S2CID 144344856.
- Katz, Jerry (2007), One: Essential Writings on Nonduality, Sentient Publications, archived from the original on 29 November 2021
- King, Richard (1995), Early Advaita Vedānta and Buddhism: The Mahāyāna Context of the Gauḍapādīya-kārikā, SUNY Press
- King, Richard (1999). "Orientalism and the Modern Myth of "Hinduism"". NUMEN. 46 (2). BRILL: 146–185. doi:10.1163/1568527991517950. S2CID 45954597.
- King, Richard (2002), Orientalism and Religion: Post-Colonial Theory, India and "The Mystic East", Routledge
- King, Richard (2013). Orientalism and Religion: Post-Colonial Theory, India and "The Mystic East". Routledge. ISBN 978-1-134-63234-3. Archived from the original on 16 January 2024.
- Klostermaier, Klaus K. (1984), Mythologies and Philosophies of Salvation in the Theistic Traditions of India, Wilfrid Laurier University Press, ISBN 978-0-88920-158-3, archived from the original on 16 January 2024
- Klostermaier, Klaus k. (2007), Hinduism: A Beginner's Guide, Oneworld Publications, ISBN 978-1851685387
- Kochumuttom, Thomas A. (1999), A buddhist Doctrine of Experience. A New Translation and Interpretation of the Works of Vasubandhu the Yogacarin, Delhi: Motilal Banarsidass
- Koller, John M. (2006), "Foreword", A thousand teachings: the Upadeśasāhasrī of Śaṅkara, Motilall Banarsidass
- Koller, John M. (2013), "Shankara", in Meister, Chad; Copan, Paul (eds.), Routledge Companion to Philosophy of Religion, Routledge
- Kulke, Hermann; Rothermund, Dietmar (1998), A History of India, Routledge
- Kumar Das, Sisir (2006). A history of Indian literature, 500–1399. Sahitya Akademi. ISBN 978-81-260-2171-0. Archived from the original on 16 January 2024.
- Larson, Gerald James; Bhattacharya, Ram Shankar (1987), The Encyclopedia of Indian Philosophies, Volume 4, Princeton University Press
- Larson, G.J. (2014), "Introduction to the Philosophy of Samkhya", in Larson, G.J.; Bhattacharya, R.S. (eds.), The Encyclopedia of Indian Philosophies, Volume 4, Princeton University Press, ISBN 978-0691604411
- Lipner, Julius J. (1996). "Ancient Banyan: an Inquiry into the Meaning of 'Hinduness'". Religious Studies. 32 (1). Cambridge University Press: 109–126. doi:10.1017/s0034412500024100. S2CID 170138813.
- Lipner, Julius (2000), "The Self of Being and the Being of Self: Samkara on "That You Are" (Tat Tvam Asi)", in Malkovsky, Bradley J. (ed.), New Perspectives on Advaita Vedānta, BRILL
- Lochtefeld, James G. (2001). The Illustrated Encyclopedia of Hinduism. New York: Rosen Publishing. ISBN 0-8239-2287-1.
- Lochtefeld, James G. (2002), The Illustrated Encyclopedia of Hinduism. Volume One: A-M, The Rosen Publishing Group
- Lochtefeld, James (2002a), "Brahman", The Illustrated Encyclopedia of Hinduism, Vol. 1: A–M, Rosen Publishing, ISBN 978-0823931798
- Long, Jeffery D. (15 April 2020). Historical Dictionary of Hinduism. Rowman & Littlefield. ISBN 978-1-5381-2294-5. Archived from the original on 16 January 2024.
- Lorenzen, David N. (2006). Who Invented Hinduism: Essays on Religion in History. Yoda Press. ISBN 9788190227261. Archived from the original on 23 December 2023.
- Lorenzen, David N., ed. (2015), A dialogue between a Christian and a Hindu about religion, El Colegio de Mexico AC
- Loy, David (1988). Nonduality : a study in comparative philosophy. New Haven: Yale University Press. ISBN 9780300038989.
- Lucas, Phillip Charles (2011), "When a Movement Is Not a Movement", Nova Religio, 15 (2): 93–114, doi:10.1525/nr.2011.15.2.93, JSTOR 10.1525/nr.2011.15.2.93
- Mackenzie, Matthew (2012), "Luminosity, Subjectivity, and Temporality: An Examination of Buddhist and Advaita views of Consciousness", in Kuznetsova, Irina; Ganeri, Jonardon; Ram-Prasad, Chakravarthi (eds.), Hindu and Buddhist Ideas in Dialogue: Self and No-Self, Routledge
- Madaio, James (24 May 2017). "Rethinking Neo-Vedānta: Swami Vivekananda and the Selective Historiography of Advaita Vedānta1". Religions. 8 (6): 101. doi:10.3390/rel8060101.
- Mahony, William (1997). The Artful Universe: An Introduction to the Vedic Religious Imagination. State University of New York Press. ISBN 978-0791435809.
- Maharaj, A (2014). "Śrī Harṣa contra Hegel: Monism, Skeptical Method, and the Limits of Reason". Philosophy East and West. 64 (1). Johns Hopkins University Press: 88, context: pp. 82–108. doi:10.1353/pew.2014.0010. S2CID 170532752.
- Malkovsky, Bradley J. (2000), "Samkara on Divine Grace", in Malkovsky, Bradley J. (ed.), New Perspectives on Advaita Vedānta: Essays in Commemoration of Professor Richard De Smet, S.J., BRILL
- Malkovsky, Bradley J. (2001). The Role of Divine Grace in the Soteriology of Śaṃkarācārya. BRILL Academic. ISBN 90-04-12044-0.
- Marek, David (2008), Dualität – Nondualität. Konzeptuelles und nichtkonzeptuelles Erkennen in Psychologie und buddhistischer Praxis (PDF), archived (PDF) from the original on 1 March 2020
- Martinez-Bedard, B. (2006). Types of Causes in Aristotle and Sankara (Thesis). Department of Religious Studies, Georgia State University.
- Mayeda, Sengaku (1992), "An Introduction to the Life and Thought of Sankara", in Mayeda, Sengaku (ed.), A Thousand Teachings: The Upadeśasāhasrī of Śaṅkara, State University of New York City Press, ISBN 0-7914-0944-9
- Mayeda, Sengaku (2006), "An Introduction to the Life and Thought of Sankara", in Mayeda, Sengaku (ed.), A Thousand Teachings: The Upadeśasāhasrī of Śaṅkara, Motilal Banarsidass, ISBN 978-8120827714
- McDaniel, June (2004), Offering Flowers, Feeding Skulls, Oxford University Press, ISBN 978-0-19-534713-5, archived from the original on 16 January 2024
- Menezes, Walter (2017), Exploring Ātman from the Perspective of the Vivekacūḍāmaṇi, Springer
- Menon, Sangeetha (2012), Advaita Vedanta, Internet Encyclopedia of Philosophy, archived from the original on 10 June 2019
- Michaels, Axel (2004), Hinduism. Past and present, Princeton, New Jersey: Princeton University Press
- Milne, Joseph (April 1997), "Advaita Vedanta and typologies of multiplicity and unity: An interpretation of nindual knowledge", International Journal of Hindu Studies, 1 (1): 165–188, doi:10.1007/s11407-997-0017-6, S2CID 143690641
- Mohanty, JN (1980), "Understanding some Ontological Differences in Indian Philosophy", Journal of Indian Philosophy, 8 (3): 205–217, doi:10.1007/BF00166295, S2CID 145752220
- Mookerji, R. (2011) [1947], Ancient Indian Education: Brahmanical and Buddhist, Motilal Banarsidass Publishers, ISBN 978-81-208-0423-4
- Morris, Brian (2006), Religion and Anthropology: A Critical Introduction, Cambridge University Press
- Mudgal, S.G. (1975). Advaita of Shankara: A Reappraisal. New Delhi: Motilal Banarasidass.
- Murti, T.R.V. (1983), "The World and the Individual in Indian Religious Thought", Studies in Indian Thought: Collected Papers of Prof. T.R.V. Murti, Motilal Banarsidass Publ.
- Muller, Max (1879). "Chandogya Upanishad 6.1–6.16". Sacred Books of the East. The Upanishads, Part I. Oxford University Press.
- Muller-Ortega, Paul E. (2010), Triadic Heart of Siva: Kaula Tantricism of Abhinavagupta in the Non-Dual Shaivism of Kashmir, SUNY press
- Murthi, S.K. Arun (2009), "The Mulavidya Controversy Among Advaita Vedantins: Was Sankara Himself responsible?", Journal of Indian Philosophy, 37 (2): 149–177, doi:10.1007/s10781-008-9053-9, S2CID 169267710
- Murti, T.R.V. (15 February 2008) [1955]. The central philosophy of Buddhism. Routledge. ISBN 978-0-415-46118-4. (2008 Reprint)
- Murti, T.R.V. (1996). Studies in Indian Thought: Collected Papers of Prof. T. R. V. Murti. Motilal Banarsidass. ISBN 978-81-208-1310-6.
- Nagao, Gadjin M. (1991). Madhyamika and Yogacara: A Study of Mahayana Philosophies. State University of New York Press. ISBN 978-0-7914-0187-3.
- Nakamura, Hajime (1990) [1950], A History of Early Vedanta Philosophy. Part One, Delhi: Motilal Banarsidass Publishers (1990 Reprint)
- Nakamura, Hajime (1999), Indian Buddhism: A Survey with Bibliographical Notes, Delhi: Motilal Banarsidass
- Nakamura, Hajime (2004) [1950], A History of Early Vedanta Philosophy. Part Two, Delhi: Motilal Banarsidass Publishers (2004 Reprint)
- Nelson, Lance E. (1996), "Living Liberation in Shankara and Classical Advaita: Sharing the Holy Waiting of God", in Fort, Andrew O.; Mumme, Patricia Y. (eds.), Living Liberation in Hindu Thought, SUNY
- Neog, Maheswar (1980), Early History of the Vaiṣṇava Faith and Movement in Assam: Śaṅkaradeva and His Times, Motilal Banarsidass, ISBN 978-81-208-0007-6, archived from the original on 6 July 2023
- Nicholson, Andrew J. (2010), Unifying Hinduism: Philosophy and Identity in Indian Intellectual History, Columbia University Press
- Nicholson, Hugh (2011). Comparative Theology and the Problem of Religious Rivalry. Oxford University Press. ISBN 978-0-19-977286-5. Archived from the original on 16 January 2024.
- Nikhilananda, S. (1958), Hinduism : Its meaning for the liberation of the spirit, Harper, ISBN 978-0911206265
- Nikhalananda, Swami (1931), Drg-Drsya-Viveka. An inquiry inti the nature of the 'seer' and the 'seen.', Sri Ramakrishna Asrama
- Novetzke, Christian (2007), Bhakti and Its Public, International Journal of Hindu Studies, vol. 11
- Nowicka, Olga (2016), "Conquering the World, Subduing the Minds: Śaṅkara's digvijaya in the Local Context", Cracow Indological Studies, XVIII (18): 145–166, doi:10.12797/CIS.18.2016.18.07
- Olivelle, Patrick (1992), The Samnyasa Upanisads, Oxford University Press, ISBN 978-0195070453
- Olivelle, Patrick (1998), Upaniṣads, Oxford University Press, ISBN 978-0-19-283576-5, archived from the original on 16 January 2024
- Olivelle, Patrick (2008), Upaniṣads, Oxford University Press, ISBN 978-0-19-954025-9
- Padiyath, Thomas (2014), The Metaphysics of Becoming: On the Relationship between Creativity and God in Whitehead and Supermind and Sachchidananda in Aurobindo, Walter de Gruyter
- Pande, Govind Chandra (1994), Life and Thought of Śaṅkarācārya, Motilal Banarsidass Publ, ISBN 978-81-208-1104-1
- Pandey, S.L. (2000), Pre-Sankara Advaita. In: Chattopadhyana (gen.ed.), "History of Science, Philosophy and Culture in Indian Civilization. Volume II Part 2: Advaita Vedanta", Delhi: Centre for Studies in Civilizations
- Payne, Richard (2005). Bulkeley, K. (ed.). Soul, Psyche, Brain. Palgrave Macmillan/Springer. ISBN 978-1-4039-7923-0.
- Phillips, Stephen (1998), Classical Indian Metaphysics, Motilal Banarsidass, ISBN 978-8120814899
- Phillips, Stephen (2009). Yoga, Karma, and Rebirth: A Brief History and Philosophy. Columbia University Press. ISBN 978-0-231-14484-1.
- Plott, John (2000), Global History of Philosophy: The Patristic-Sutra period (325 – 800 AD), Volume 3, Motilal Banarsidass, ISBN 978-8120805507
- Potter, Karl H. (1981), "Gaudapada", Encyclopedia of Indian Philosophies Vol.3: Advaita Vedānta up to Śaṃkara and his pupils, Motilal Banarsidass, ISBN 81-208-0310-8
- Potter, Karl H. (1998), Encyclopedia of Indian Philosophies Vol.3: Advaita Vedānta up to Śaṃkara and his pupils (Reprint ed.), Motilal Banarsidass, ISBN 978-81-208-0310-7
- Potter, Karl H. (2008), Encyclopedia of Indian Philosophies Vol. 3: Advaita Vedānta Up to Śaṃkara and His Pupils, Delhi: Motilal Banarsidass Publishers, ISBN 978-81-208-0310-7
- Potter, Karl (2006), Encyclopedia of Indian Philosophies Vol. II: Advaita Vedanta From 800 To 1200, Motilal Banarsidass Publishers, ISBN 81-208-3061-X
- Potter, Karl H. (2014), Encyclopedia of Indian Philosophies Vol. 3: Advaita Vedānta Up to Śaṃkara and His Pupils, Princeton University Press, ISBN 978-0-691-61486-1
- Pradhan, Basant (5 November 2014). Yoga and Mindfulness Based Cognitive Therapy: A Clinical Guide. Springer. ISBN 978-3-319-09105-1. Archived from the original on 16 January 2024.
- Puligandla, Ramakrishna (1997), Fundamentals of Indian Philosophy, New Delhi: D.K. Printworld (P) Ltd.
- Raju, P. T. (2013), The Philosophical Traditions of India, Routledge, p. 228, ISBN 9781135029425
- Raju, P.T. (1971), The Philosophical Traditions of India, Delhi: Motilal Banarsidass (1992 Reprint)
- Raju, P.T. (1985). Structural Depths of Indian Thought. State University of New York Press. ISBN 978-0-88706-139-4.
- Raju, P.T. (1992), The Philosophical Traditions of India, Delhi: Motilal Banarsidass Publishers
- Raju, P.T. (2006), Idealistic Thought of India, Routledge, ISBN 978-1406732627
- Ram-Prasad, Chakravarthi (2013), "Situating the Elusive Self of Advaita Vedanta" (PDF), in Siderits, Mark; Thompson, Evan; Zahavi, Dan (eds.), Self, No Self?: Perspectives from Analytical, Phenomenological, and Indian Traditions, Oxford University Press, archived (PDF) from the original on 2 October 2022
- Ram-Prasad, Chakravarthi (2013a). Advaita Epistemology and Metaphysics: An Outline of Indian Non-Realism. Taylor & Francis. ISBN 978-1-136-86897-9.
- Rambachan, Anantanand (1984), The attainment of moksha according to Shankara and Vivekananda with special reference to the significance of scripture (sruti) and experience (anubhabva) (PDF), University of Leeds, archived (PDF) from the original on 20 October 2020
- Rambachan, Anantanand (1991), Accomplishing the Accomplished: Vedas as a Source of Valid Knowledge in Sankara, University of Hawaii Press, ISBN 978-0-8248-1358-1
- Rambachan, Anatanand (1994), The Limits of Scripture: Vivekananda's Reinterpretation of the Vedas, University of Hawaii Press
- Rambachan, Anatanand (2006), The Advaita Worldview: God, World, and Humanity, State University of New York Press, ISBN 978-0791468524, archived from the original on 16 January 2024
- Rao, G. H. (1926). "The Basis of Hindu Ethics". International Journal of Ethics. 37: 19–35. doi:10.1086/intejethi.37.1.2378204.
- Rao, K. Ramakrishna; Paranjpe, Anand C. (2015). Psychology in the Indian Tradition. Springer. ISBN 978-81-322-2440-2.
- Reddy Juturi, Ravi Kumar (2021), "Gaudapadacharya "asparsa yoga" for attaining "no mind": A historical method of advaita vedanta for teaching "human liberation" in a profound way", International Journal of Yoga: Philosophy, Psychology and Parapsychology, 9 (2): 67–72, doi:10.4103/2347-5633.329692, S2CID 240322563, archived from the original on 13 January 2022
- Renard, Philip (2010), Non-Dualisme. De directe bevrijdingsweg, Cothen: Uitgeverij Juwelenschip
- Rigopoulos, Antonio (1998). Dattatreya: The Immortal Guru, Yogin, and Avatara: A Study of the Transformative and Inclusive Character of a Multi-faceted Hindu Deity. State University of New York Press. ISBN 978-0-7914-3696-7.
- Roeser, Robert W. (2005). An introduction to Hindu India's contemplative psychological perspective on motivation, self, and development (pdf ed.).
- Roodurmun, Pulasth Soobah (2002), Bhāmatī and Vivaraṇa Schools of Advaita Vedānta: A Critical Approach, Delhi: Motilal Banarsidass Publishers
- Rosen, Richard (2001). "Review of Yogayajnavalkya Samhita by TKV Desikachar". Yoga. No. March/April. pp. 147–149. Archived from the original on 16 January 2024.
- Rosen, Steven (2006), Essential Hinduism, Greenwood Publishing Group, ISBN 9780275990060, archived from the original on 23 December 2023
- Sahasrabudhe, M. T. (1968). A Survey of the Pre-Śaṅkara Advaita Vedānta. University of Poona Press.
- Sajdek, Pawel (2019). "The liberation doctrine in Brahmasiddhi of Manḍanamiśra". Argument. 9: 43–56. doi:10.24917/20841043.03 (inactive 1 July 2025).
- Śaṅkarācārya (1949). A Thousand Teachings. Translated by S Jagadananda. Vedanta Press. ISBN 978-81-7120-059-7. OCLC 218363449. Sanskrit:Upadesha sahasri Archived 4 March 2016 at the Wayback Machine
- Sankara (2006), "A Thousand teachings", in Mayeda, Sengaku (ed.), A Thousand Teachings: The Upadesasahasri of Sankara, Motilal Banarsidass, ISBN 978-81-208-2771-4, archived from the original on 16 January 2024
- Sarma, Candradhara (1994). A Critical Survey of Indian Philosophy. Motilal Banarsidass. ISBN 81-208-0365-5.
- Sarma, Candradhara (1996). The Advaita Tradition in Indian Philosophy. Motilal Banarsidass. ISBN 978-81-208-1312-0. Archived from the original on 16 January 2024.
- Sarma, Candradhara (1997), A Critical Survey of Indian Philosophy, Motilal Banarsidass, ISBN 81-208-0365-5
- Sarma, Candradhara (2007), The Advaita Tradition in Indian Philosophy, Motilal Banarsidass, ISBN 978-8120813120
- Satchidanandendra Sarasvati (1997), The Method of the Vedanta. A Critical Account of the Advaita Tradition, Motilall Banarsidass
- Scharfstein, Ben-Ami (1998), A comparative history of world philosophy: from the Upanishads to Kant, Albany: State University of New York Press
- Scheepers, Alfred (2010), De wortels van hett Indiase denken, Olive Press
- Shah-Kazemi, Reza (2006), Paths to Transcendence: According to Shankara, Ibn Arabi, and Meister Eckhart, World Wisdom
- Shastri, Prabhu Dutt (1911). The doctrine of Maya in the philosophy of the Vedanta. London: Luzac & Co.
- Sharma, Arvind (1993), The Experiential Dimension of Advaita Vedanta, Motilal Banarsidass Publishers
- Sharma, Arvind (1995), The Philosophy of Religion and Advaita Vedanta, Penn State University Press, ISBN 978-0271028323
- Sharma, Arvind (1997). The Rope and the Snake: A Metaphorical Exploration of Advaita Vedānta. Manohar Publishers. pp. 1–16. ISBN 978-81-7304-179-2.
- Sharma, Arvind (2000), "Sacred Scriptures and the Mysticism of Advaita Vedanta", in Katz, Steven T. (ed.), Mysticism and Sacred Scripture, Oxford University Press
- Sharma, Arvind (2004). Sleep as a State of Consciousness in Advaita Vedånta. State University of New York Press.
- Sharma, Arvind (2006). A Guide to Hindu Spirituality. World Wisdom. ISBN 978-1-933316-17-8. Archived from the original on 16 January 2024.
- Sharma, Arvind (2007), Advaita Vedānta: An Introduction, Motilal Banarsidass, ISBN 978-8120820272
- Sharma, Arvind (2008). The Philosophy of Religion and Advaita Vedanta: A Comparative Study in Religion and Reason. Pennsylvania State University Press. ISBN 978-0-271-03946-6.
- Sharma, B.N., B. N. Krishnamurti (2000), A History of the Dvaita School of Vedānta and Its Literature, 3rd Edition, Motilal Banarsidass Pvt. Ltd.(2008 Reprint), ISBN 978-8120815759
- Sheridan, Daniel (1986). The Advaitic Theism of the Bhāgavata Purāṇa. Columbia: South Asia Books. ISBN 81-208-0179-2. Archived from the original on 16 January 2024.
- Sheridan, Daniel (1991). Texts in Context: Traditional Hermeneutics in South Asia (Editor: Jeffrey Timm). State University of New York Press. ISBN 978-0791407967.
- Sinha, Jadunath (2016), Indian Philosophy Volume 2, Motilal Banarsidass
- Sinha, Jadunath (2013). Indian Psychology Perception. Routledge. pp. 306–314. ISBN 978-1-136-34605-7.
- Sivananda (1977), Brahma Sutras, Motilal Banarsidass
- Sivananda, Swami (1993), All About Hinduism, The Divine Life Society
- Sivaraman, K. (1973), Śaivism in Philosophical Perspective: A Study of the Formative Concepts, Problems, and Methods of Śaiva Siddhānta, Motilall Banarsidass
- Smith, David (2003), The Dance of Siva: Religion, Art and Poetry in South India, Cambridge University Press, ISBN 978-0-521-52865-8, archived from the original on 16 January 2024
- Staal, Frits (2008). Discovering the Vedas: Origins, Mantras, Rituals, Insights. Penguin Books. p. 365 note 159. ISBN 978-0-14-309986-4.
- Stoker, Valerie (2016), Polemics and Patronage in the City of Victory: Vyasatirtha, Hindu Sectarianism, and the Sixteenth-Century Vijayanagara Court, University of California Press
- Sullivan, Bruce M. (1997). Historical Dictionary of Hinduism. Scarecrow. ISBN 978-0-8108-3327-2.
- Suthren Hirst, J. G. (2005), Śaṃkara's Advaita Vedānta: A Way of Teaching, Routledge, ISBN 978-1-134-25441-5
- Sydnor, Jon Paul (2023). "Introduction". In Sydnor, Jon Paul; Watson, Anthony J. (eds.). Nondualism: An Interreligious Exploration. Bloomsbury Publishing.
- Talbot, Cynthia (2001), Precolonial India in Practice: Society, Region, and Identity in Medieval Andhra, Oxford University Press, ISBN 978-0-19-513661-6
- Thibaut, George (1890). Muller, Max (ed.). The Sacred Books of the East: The Vedanta-Sutras, Part 1. Oxford University Press.
- Timalsina, Sthaneshwar (2008). Consciousness in Indian Philosophy: The Advaita Doctrine of 'Awareness Only'. Routledge. pp. 137–138. ISBN 978-1-135-97092-5.
- Timalsina, Sthaneshwar (2014). Consciousness in Indian Philosophy: The Advaita Doctrine of 'Awareness Only'. Routledge. ISBN 978-0-415-76223-6.
- Timalsina, Sthaneshwar (November 2017). "Puruṣavāda: A Pre-Śaṅkara Monistic Philosophy as Critiqued by Mallavādin". Journal of Indian Philosophy. 45 (5): 939–959. doi:10.1007/s10781-017-9329-z. S2CID 171790006. Archived from the original on 4 January 2022.
- Thrasher, Allen Wright (1993). The Advaita Vedānta of Brahma-siddhi. Motilal Banarsidass. ISBN 978-81-208-0982-6. Archived from the original on 16 January 2024.
- Vachatimanont, Sakkapohl (2005), "On why the traditional Advaic resolution of jivanmukti is superior to the neo-Vedantic resolution", Macalester Journal of Philosophy, 14 (1): 47–48
- Venkatramaiah, Munagala (2000), Talks With Sri Ramana Maharshi: On Realizing Abiding Peace and Happiness, Inner Directions, ISBN 1-878019-00-7
- Vireshwarananda, Swami (1936), Adhyasa or Superimposition, archived from the original on 9 December 2021
- Vireswarananda, Swami (2019) [1936]. Brahma Sutras. According to Sri Sankara. Advaita Ashrama.
- Vivekananda, Swami (1947). The Complete Works of Swami Vivekananda, Volume 7.
- Volker, Fabian (2023). "The Plurality of Nonduality: Toward a Tripartite Typology". In Sydnor, Jon Paul; Watson, Anthony J. (eds.). Nondualism: An Interreligious Exploration. Bloomsbury Publishing.
- Vroom, H.M. (1989). Religions and the Truth: Philosophical Reflections and Perspectives. Eerdmans Publishing. ISBN 978-0802805027.
- Werner, Karel (1994), The Yogi and the Mystic, Routledge
- Whaling, Frank (1979). "Shankara and Buddhism". Journal of Indian Philosophy. 7 (1): 1–42. doi:10.1007/BF02561251. S2CID 170613052.
- Wilber, Ken (2000), Integral Psychology, Shambhala Publications
- Williams, Paul; Tribe, Anthony; Wynne, Alexander (2000). Buddhist Thought: A Complete Introduction to the Indian Tradition. Routledge. ISBN 0-415-20701-0.
- Williams, Paul (2008). Mahayana Buddhism: The Doctrinal Foundations. Routledge. ISBN 978-1-134-25056-1. Archived from the original on 11 January 2023.
- Wood, Thomas E. (1992), The Māṇḍūkya Upaniṣad and the Āgama Śāstra: An Investigation into the Meaning of the Vedānta
- Yao, Zhihua (2005). The Buddhist Theory of Self-Cognition.
- Yogani (2011), Advanced Yoga Practices Support Forum Posts of Yogani, 2005–2010, AYP Publishing

Web-sources
