= Tourism in Bihar =

The state of Bihar (Hindi: बिहार) in eastern India, is one of the oldest inhabited places in the world with a history going back 3000 years. The rich culture and heritage of Bihar is evident from the innumerable ancient monuments that are dotted all over the state. Bihar is home to many tourist attractions and is visited by large numbers of tourists from all over the world. Around total 6 million tourists visit Bihar every year.

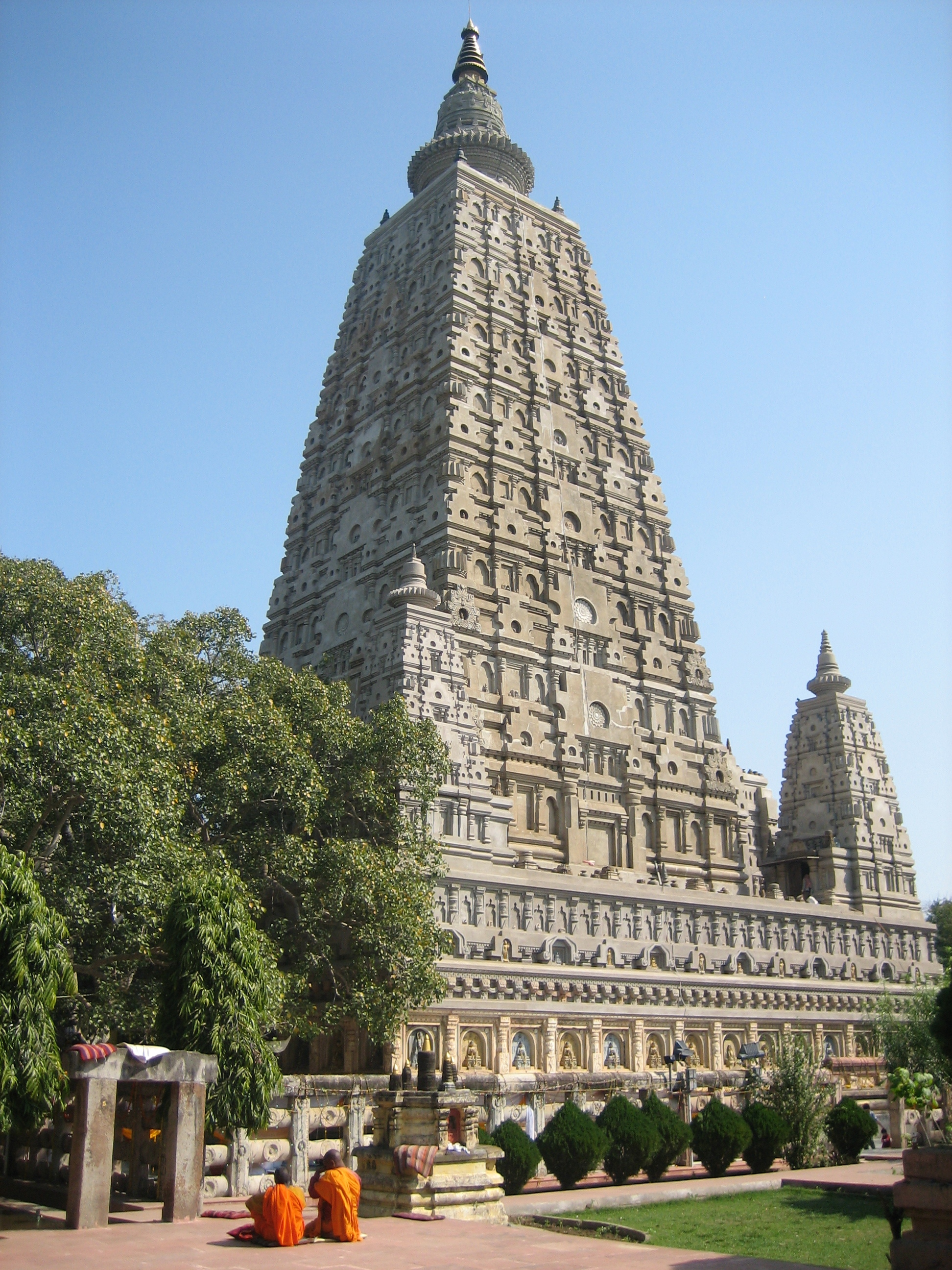
Mahabodhi Temple, Bodh Gaya

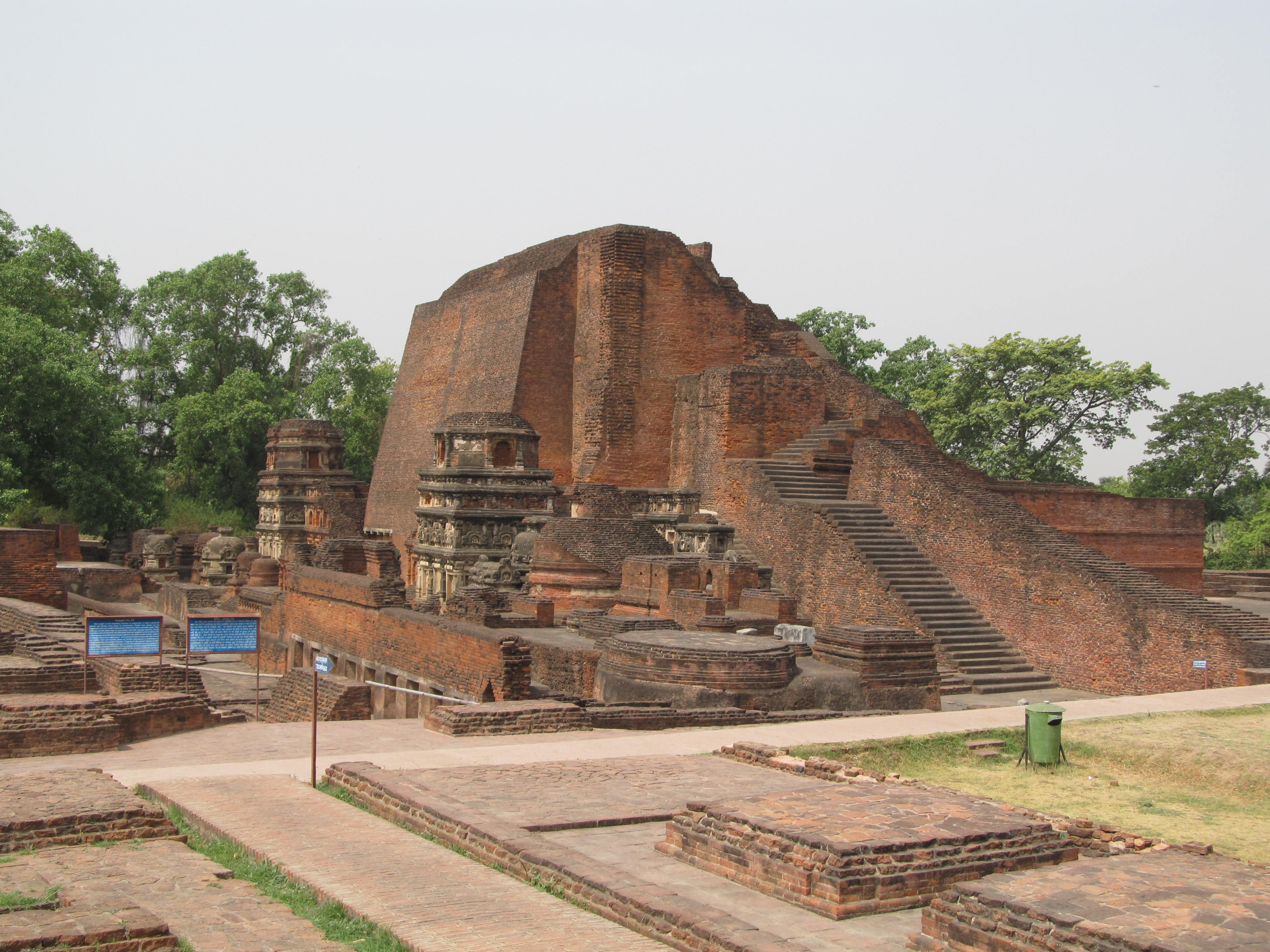
Ruins of Nalanda Mahavihara

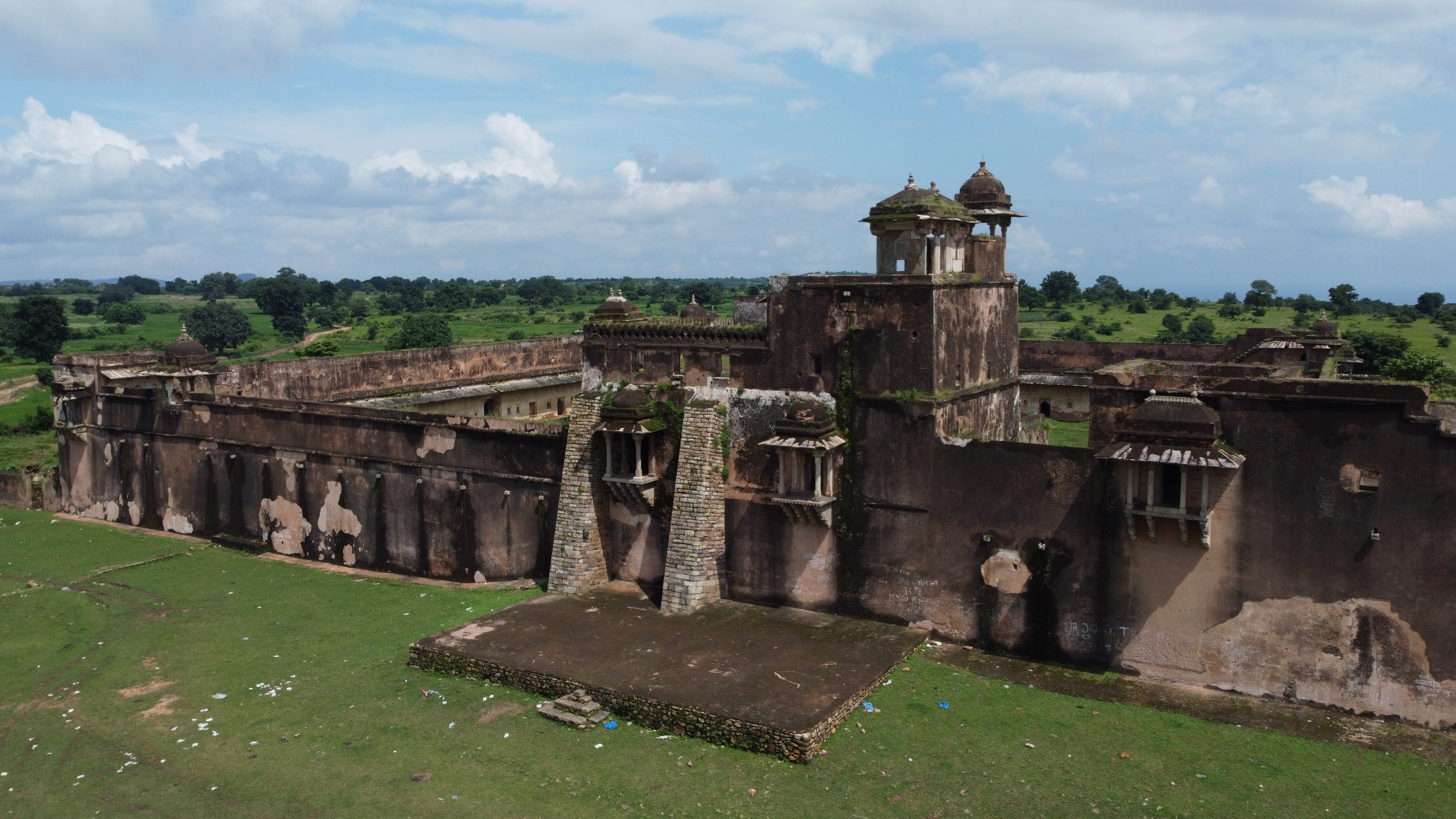
Rohtasgarh Fort at Rohtas

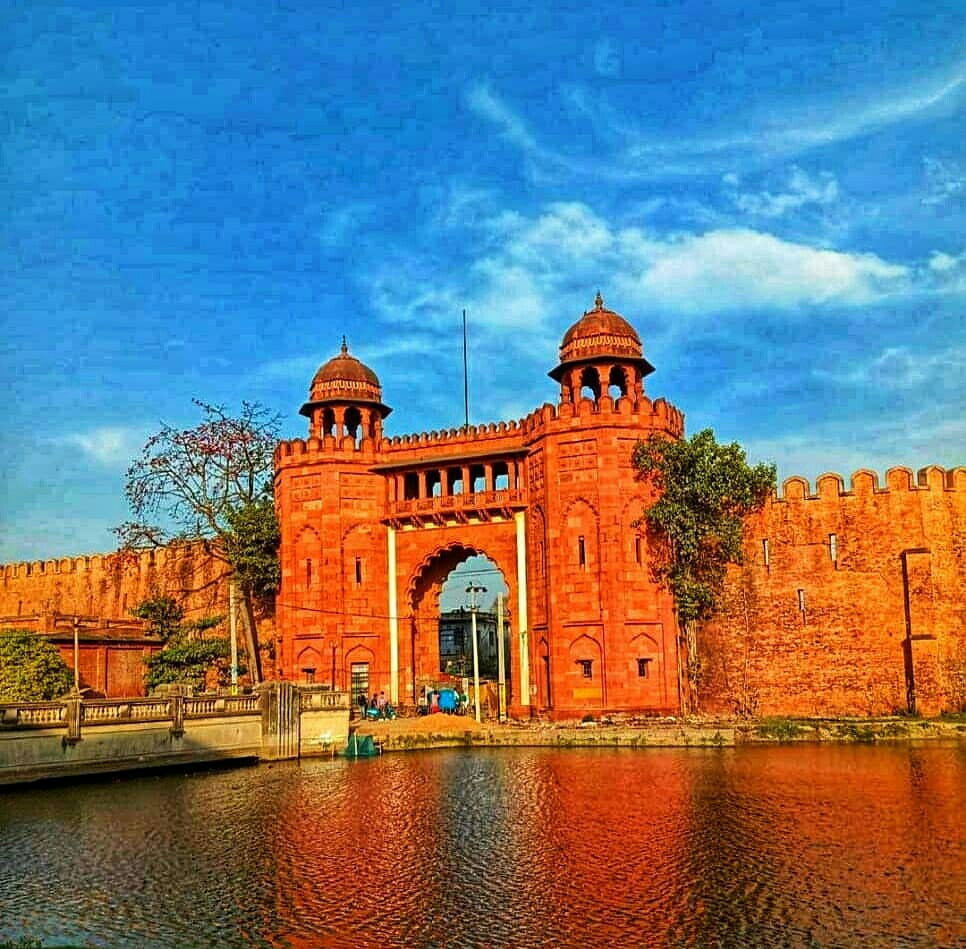
Darbhanga Fort in Darbhanga

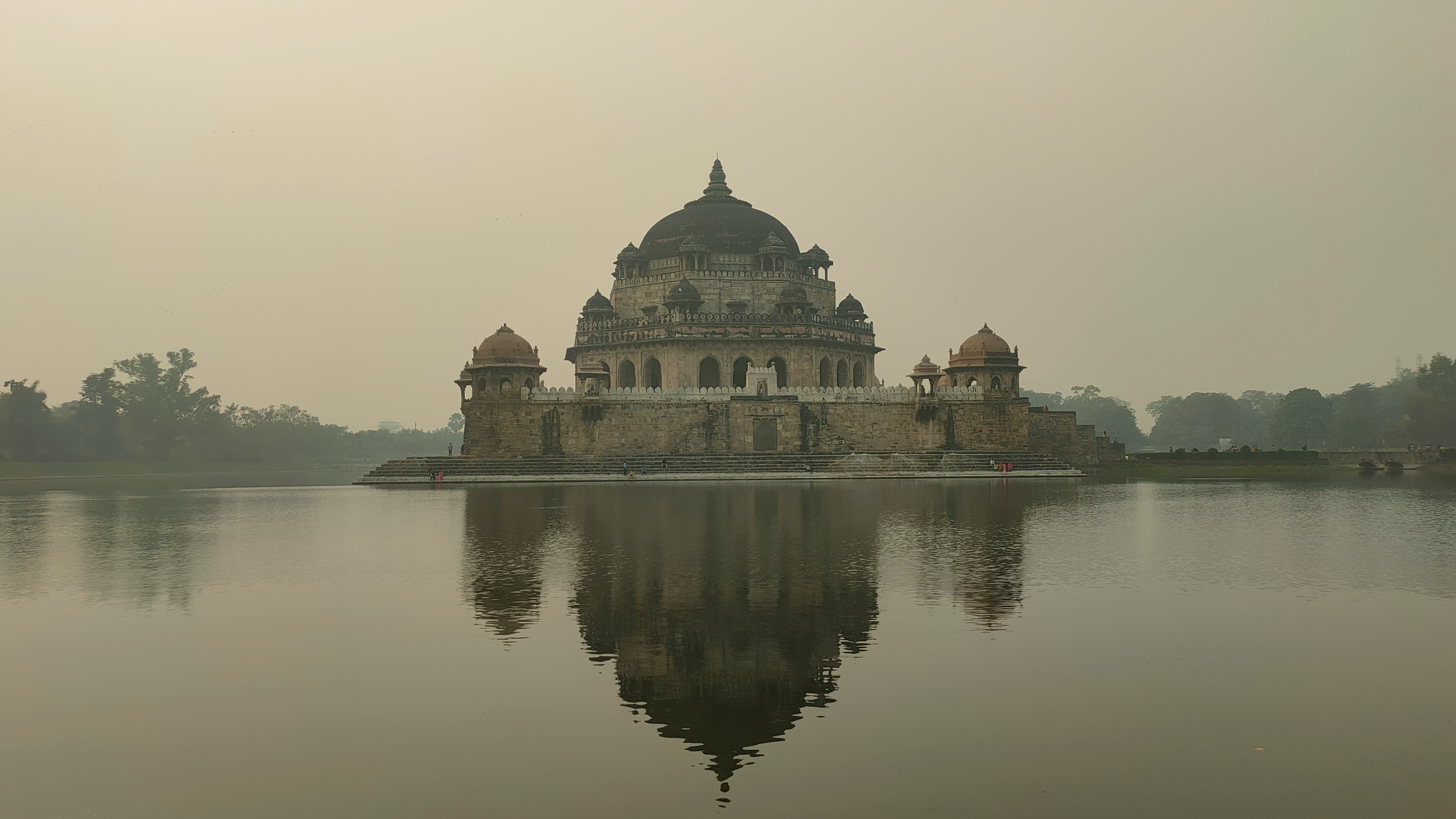
Sher Shah Suri Tomb at Sasaram

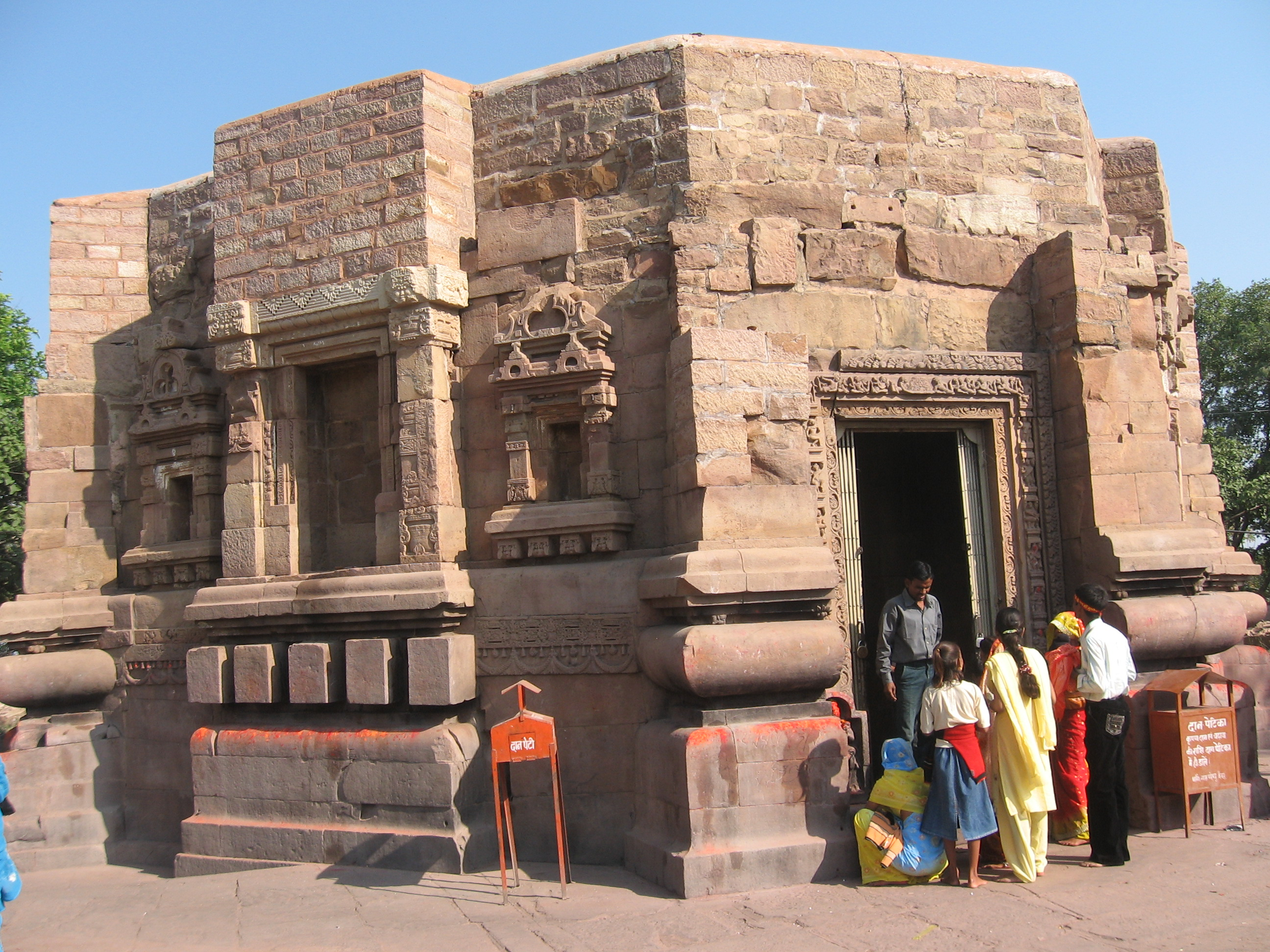
Mundeshwari Temple in Kaimur

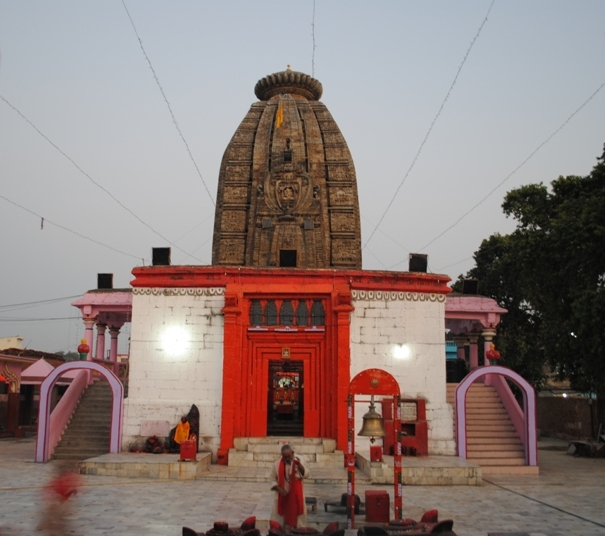
Deo Sun Temple in Aurangabad

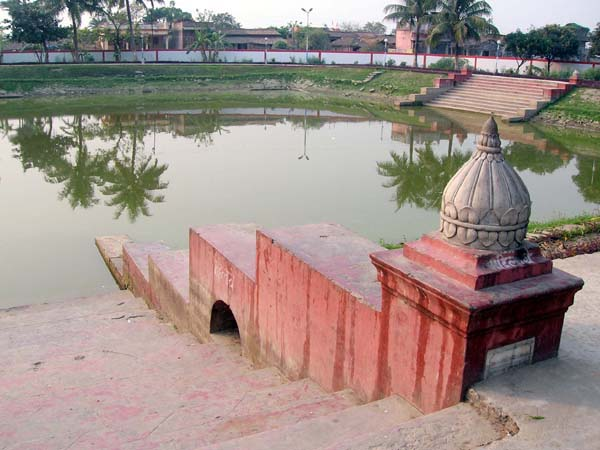
Janaki Kund at Sitamarhi

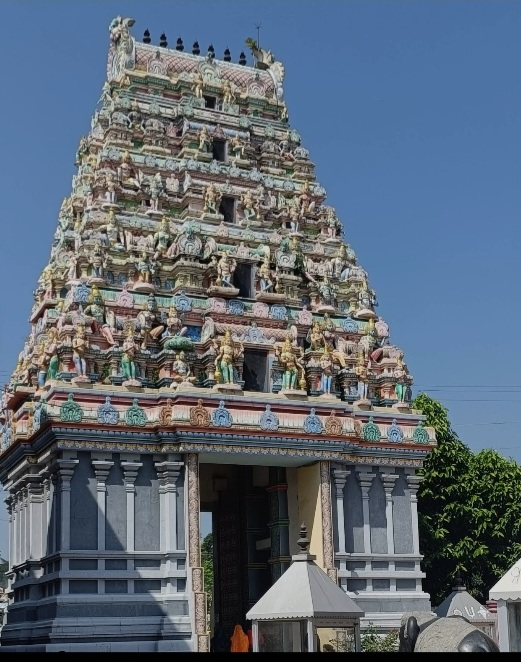
Vishnudham Mandir in Bihar

Megasthenes (B.C. 350–290 B.C.) visited the region in reign of Chandragupta Maurya. His observations were recorded in Indika. Dionysius was son of Megasthenes, who visited Pataliputra in reign of Ashoka. Hsuan-Tsang and I Ching visited Nalanda to study in the 7th century. This state is the place of Mahavira, the 24th and last Tirthankara, Aryabhata, Great Ashoka, Chanakya, Gautama Buddha, Mahavira, Guru Gobind Singh, Chandragupta Maurya, Vātsyāyana, Sher Shah Suri, Maa Tara Chandi Temple, and many other great historical figures.

Bihar ranked 8th in the top 10 states/UTs of India in number of foreign tourist visits in 2017. The year 2019, saw highest number of tourists in Bihar, with over 35 million tourists, including 11.9 million foreign tourists.

== Monuments and museums ==
Monuments of Bihar
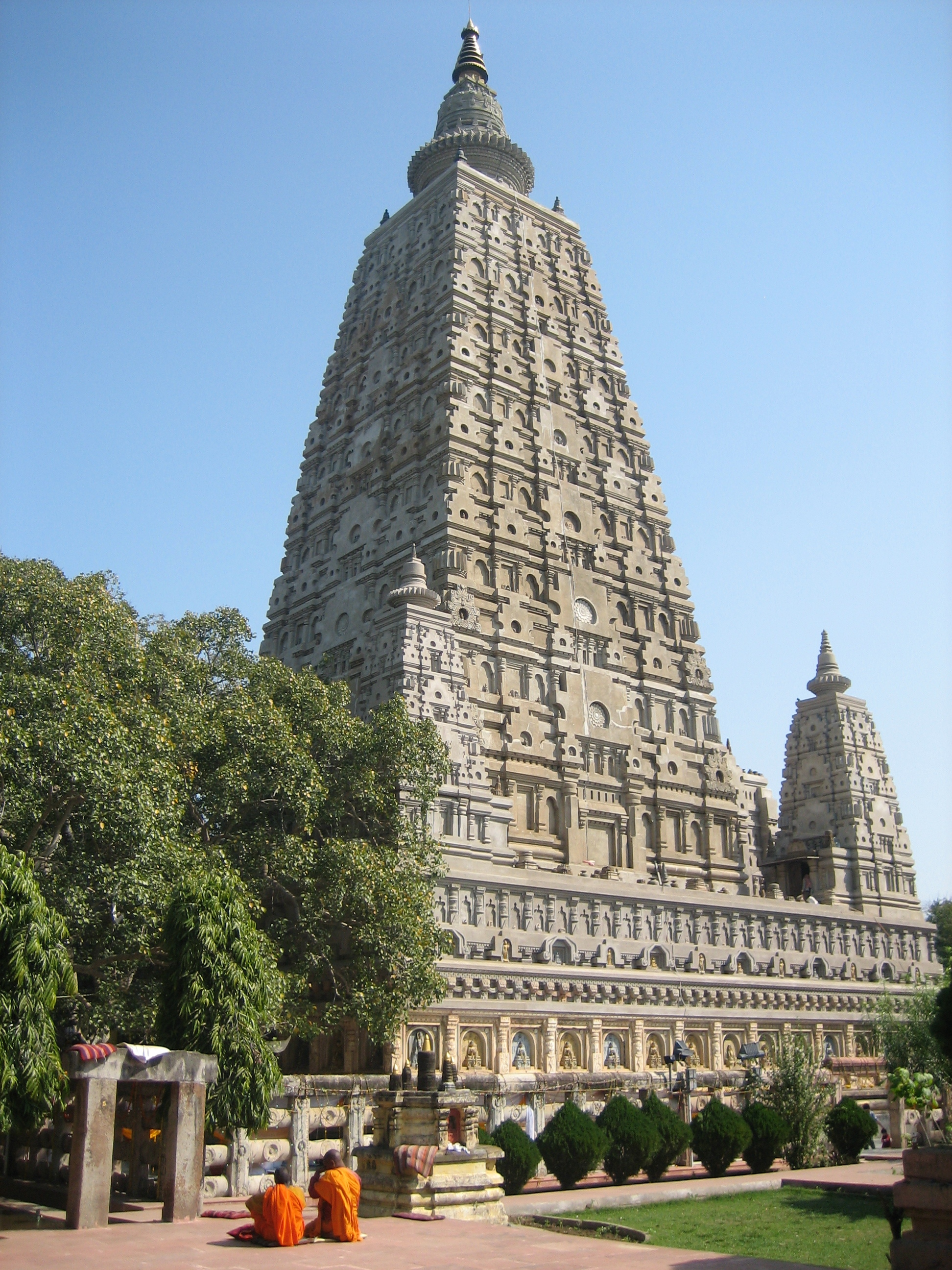
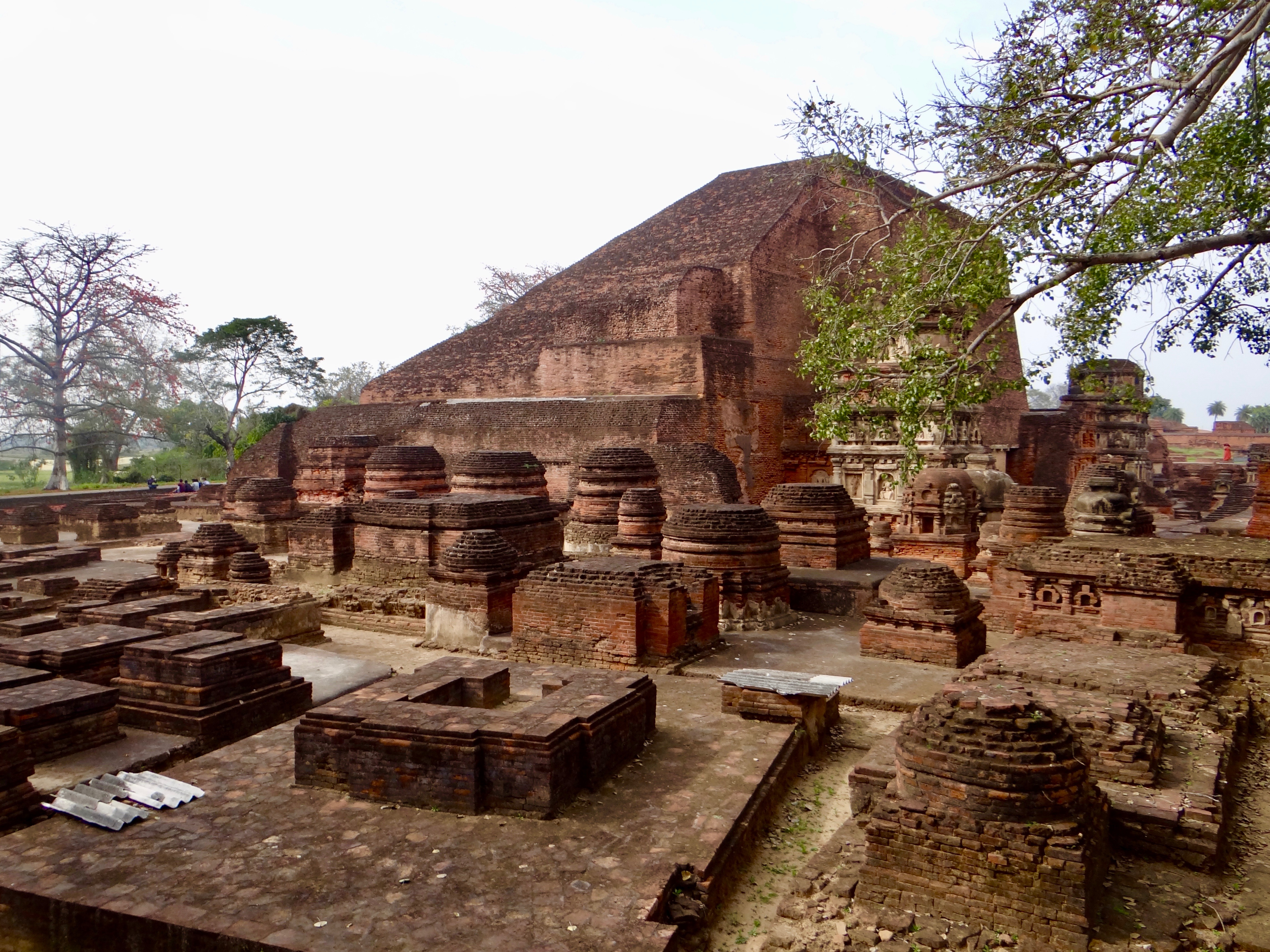
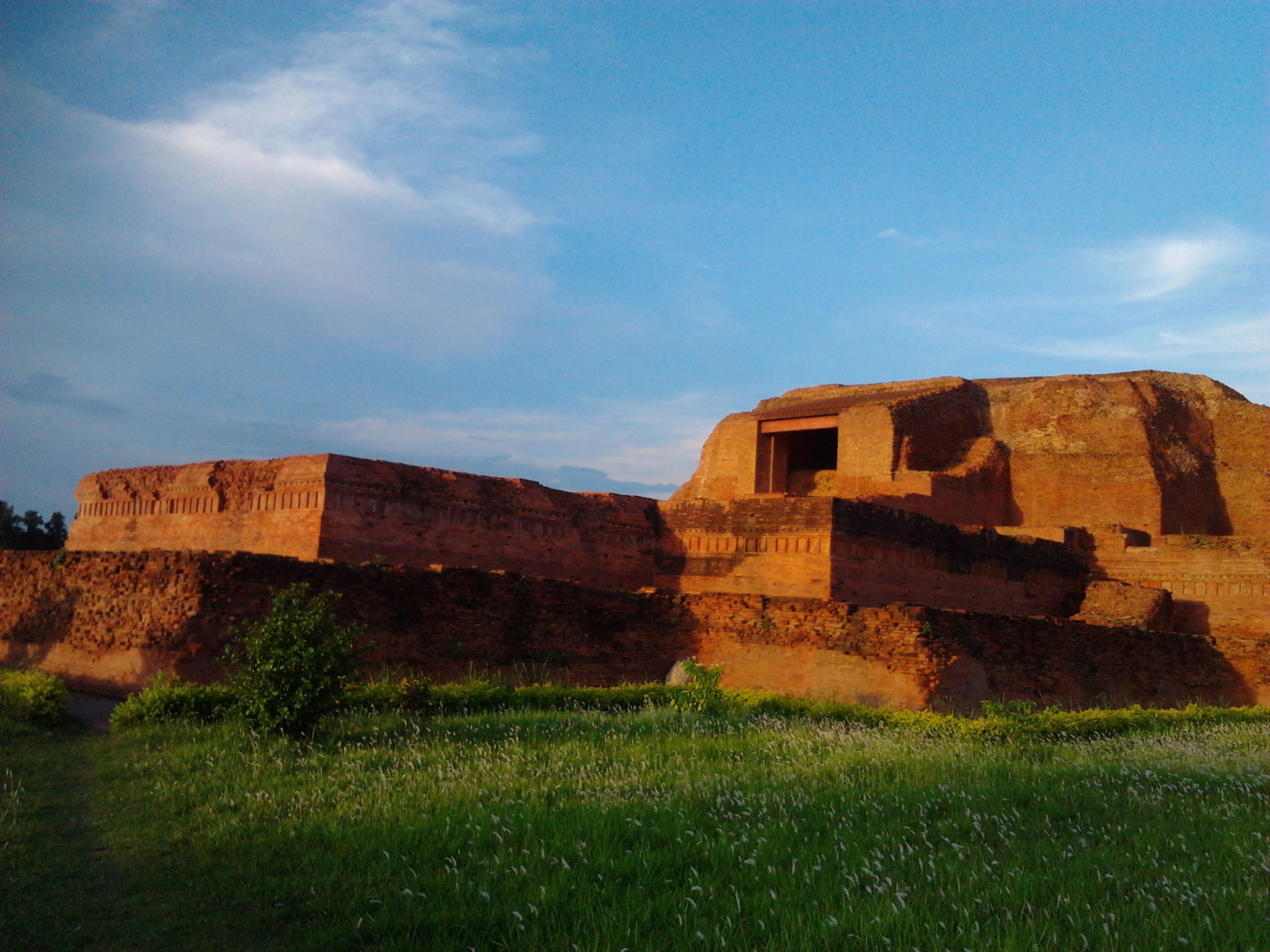
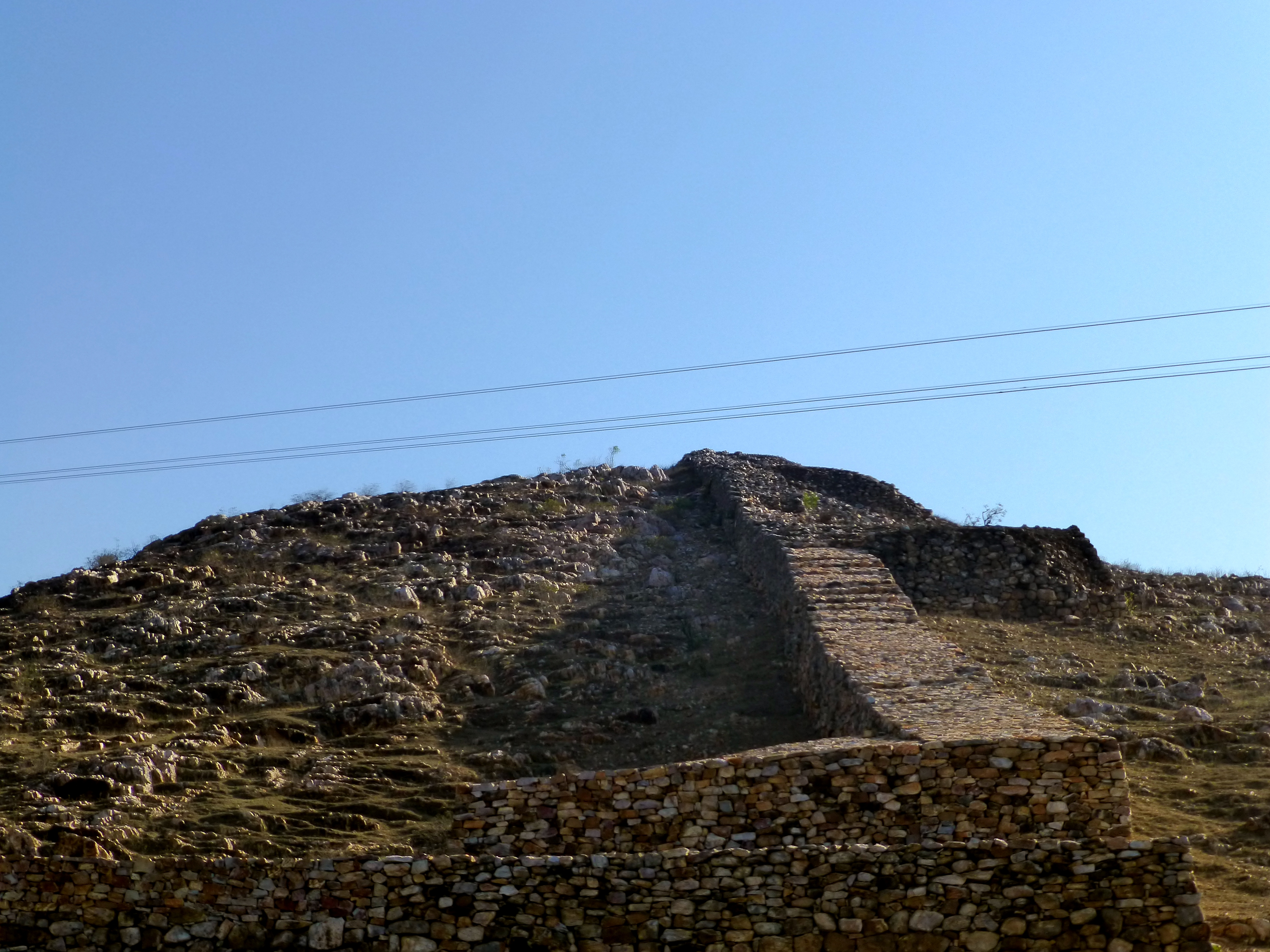
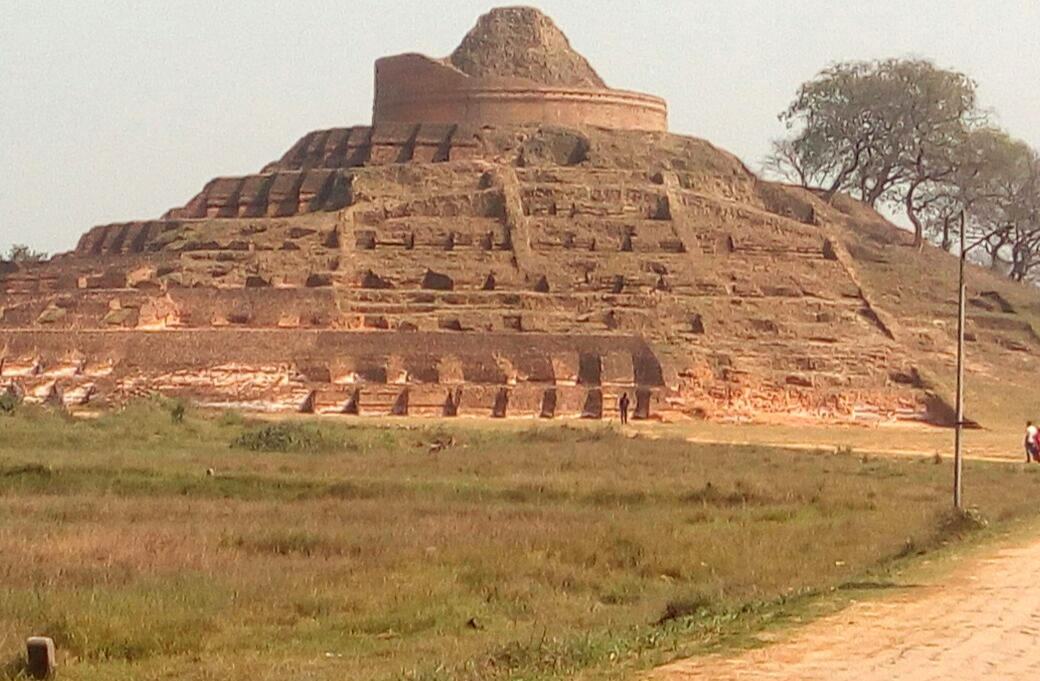
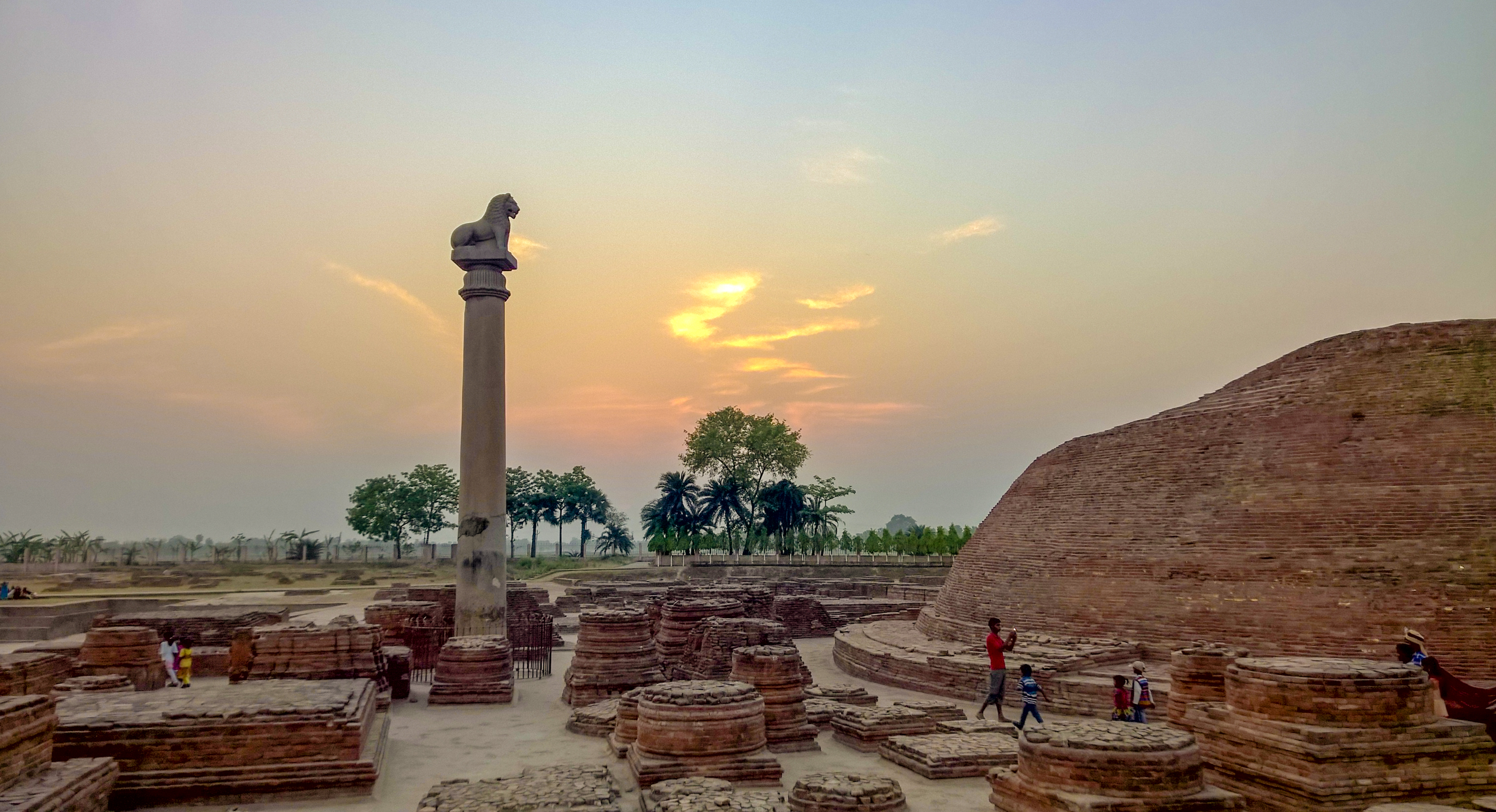
Mahabodhi Temple (an UNESCO World Heritage Site), Nalanda(an UNESCO World Heritage Site), Vikramashila, Cyclopean Wall of Rajgir, Kesaria stupa, Pillars of Ashoka
Museum in Bihar
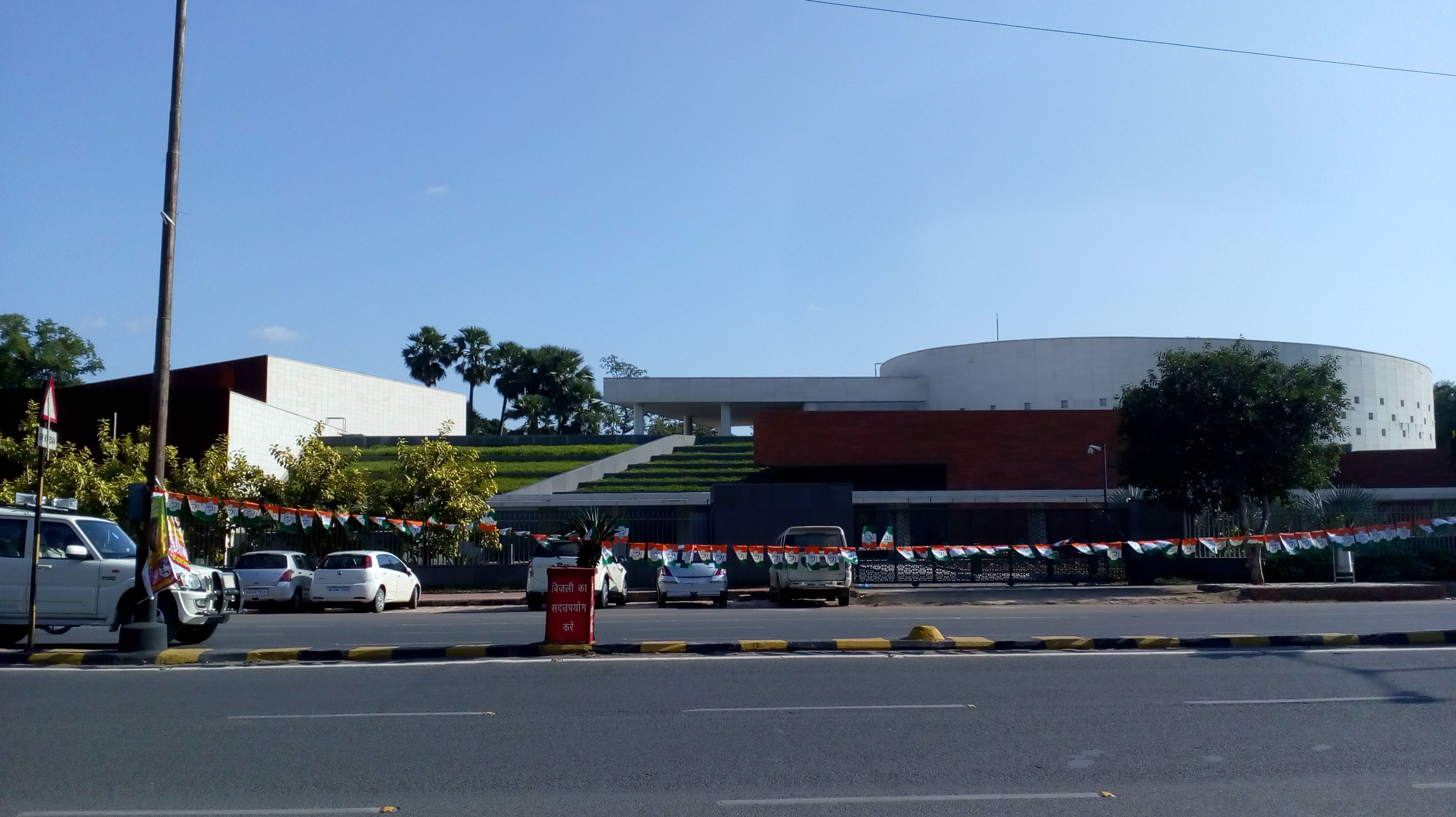
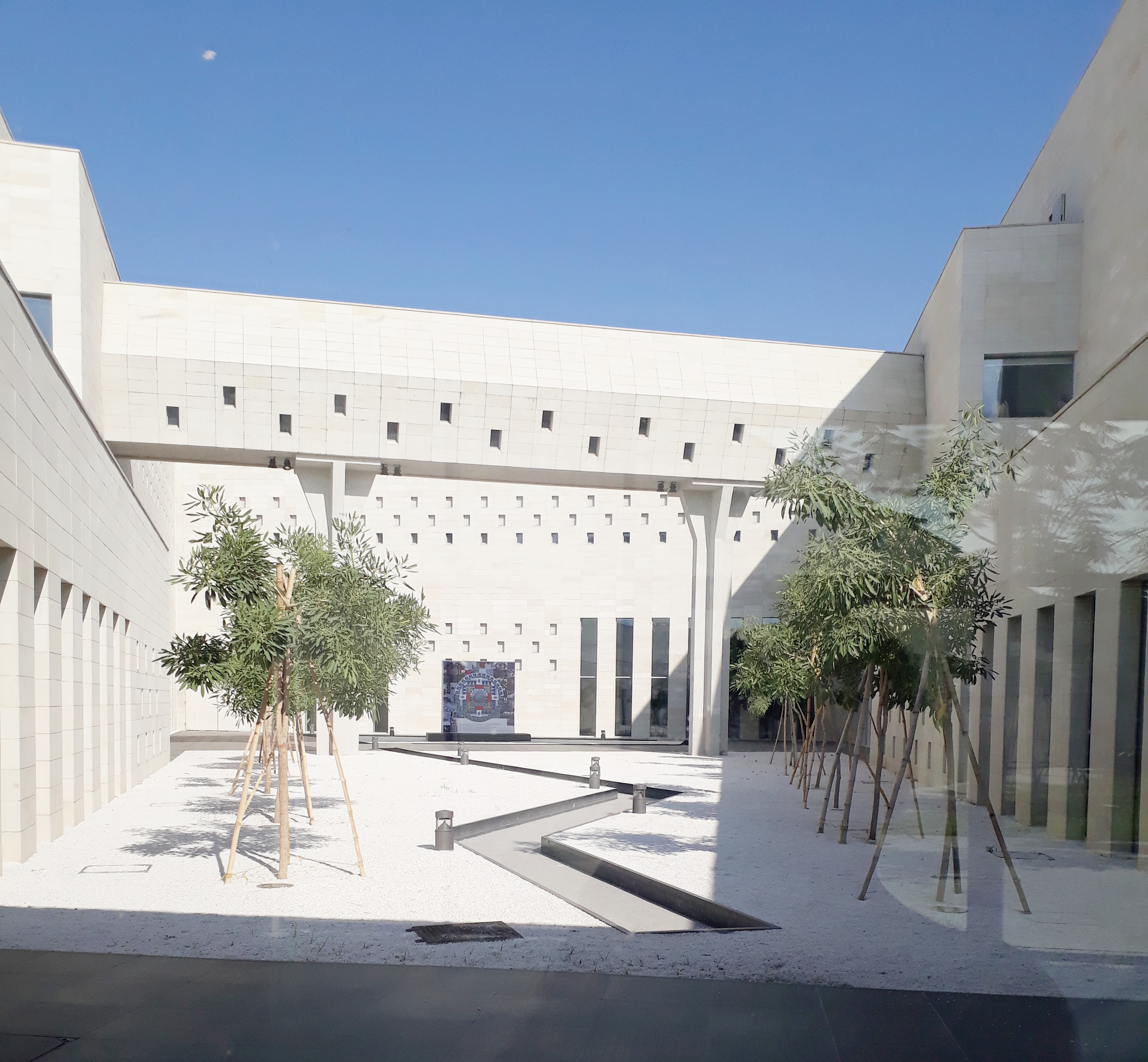
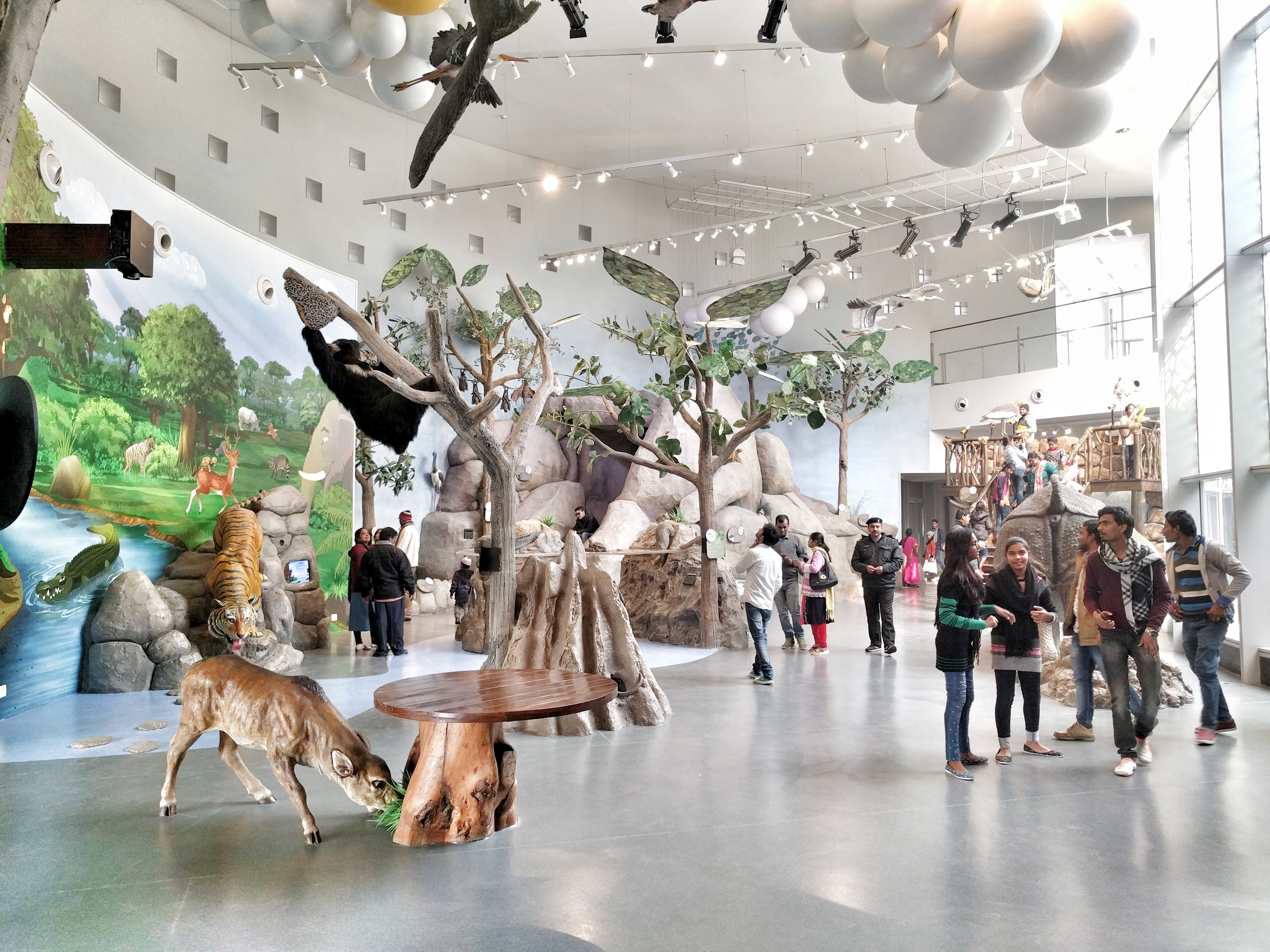
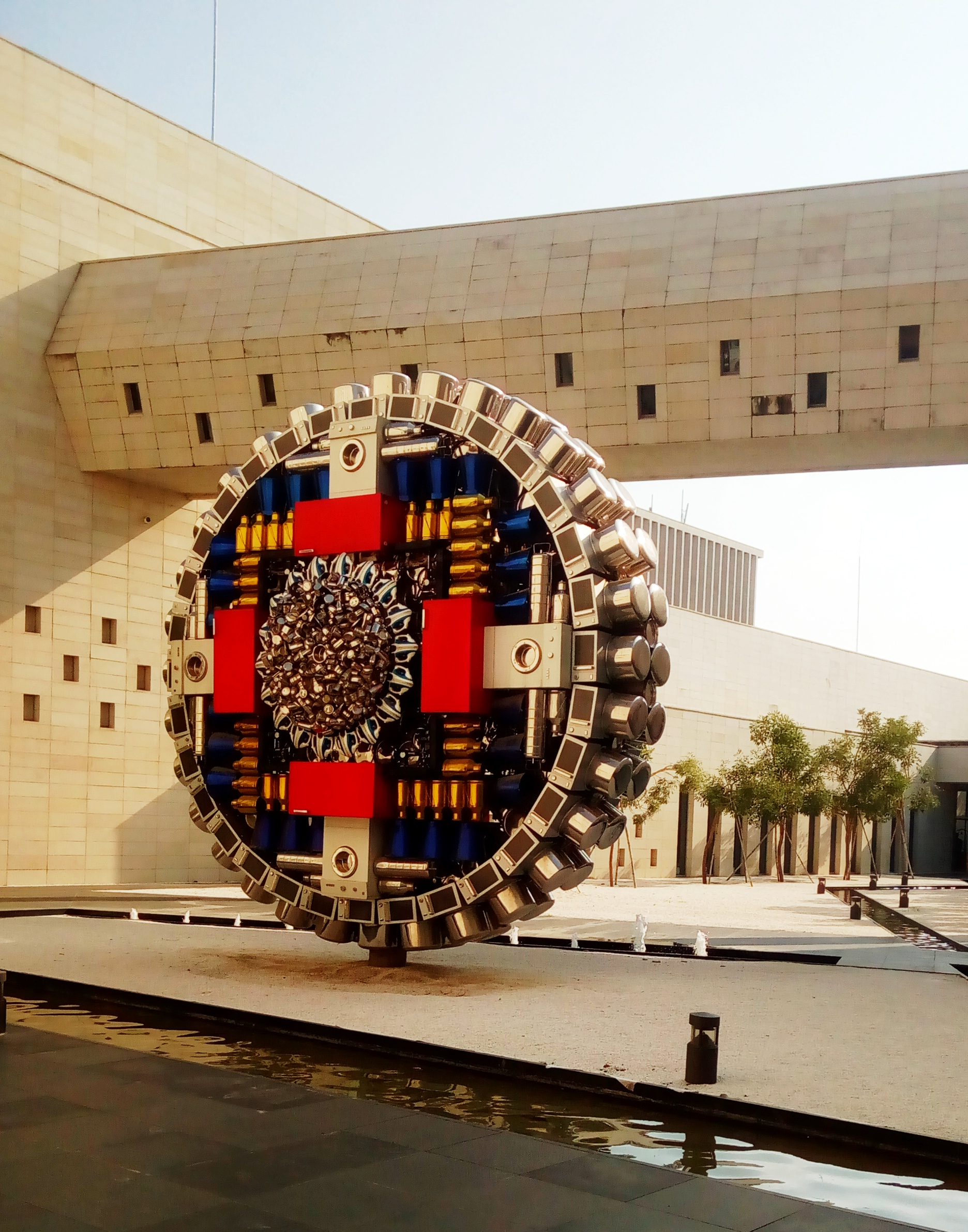
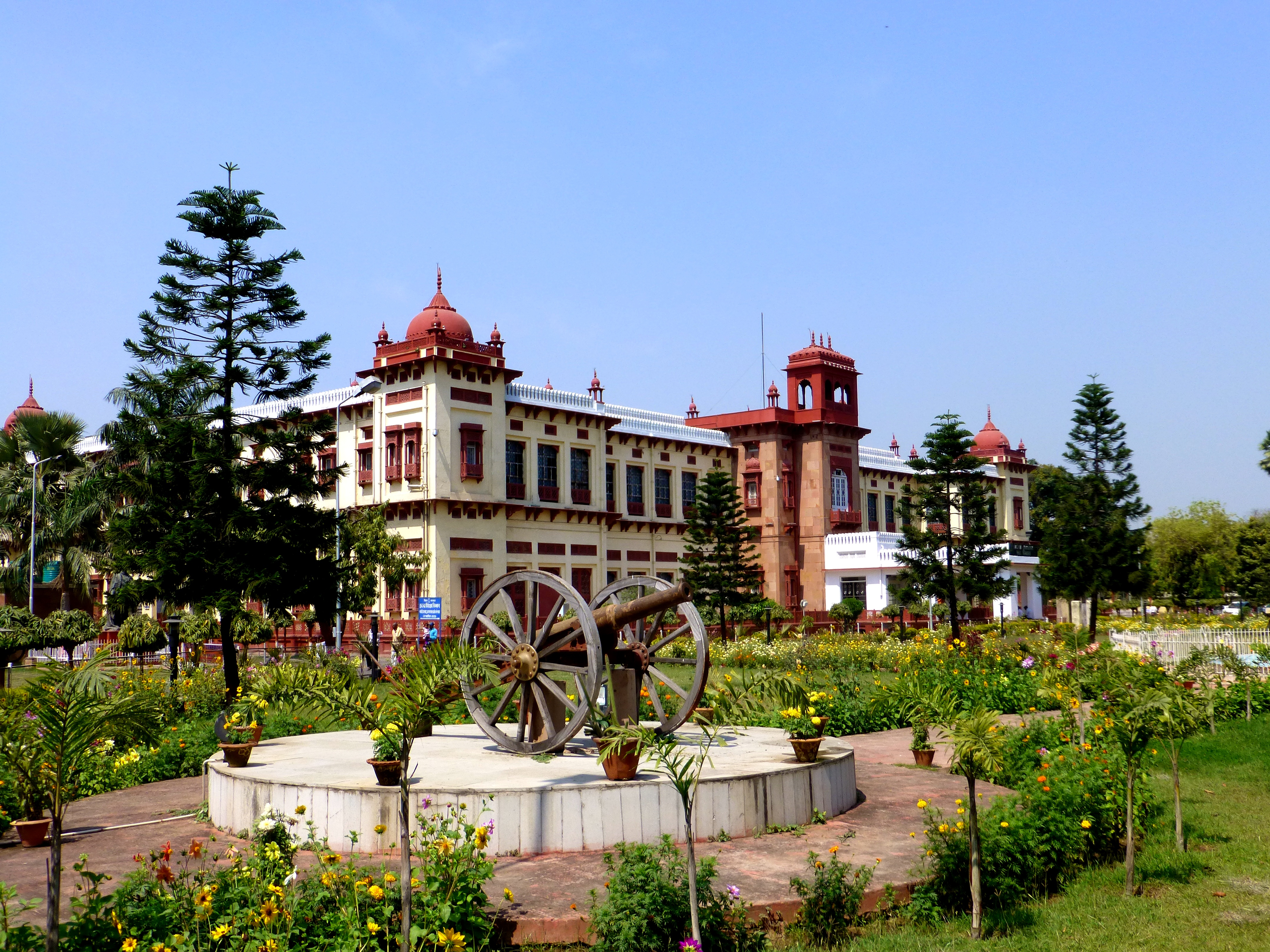
Bihar Museum (approach road, exterior, artifacts, and gallery), Patna Museum, Patna Planetarium

=== Monuments ===
Mahabodhi Mahavihar, (literally: "Great Awakening Temple"), a UNESCO World Heritage Site, is an ancient, but much rebuilt and restored, Buddhist temple in Bodh Gaya, marking the location where the Buddha is said to have attained enlightenment. Bodh Gaya (in Gaya district) is about 96 km (60 mi) from Patna, Bihar state, India. Nalanda Mahavihara, a UNESCO World Heritage Site, is an worlds oldest university situated in Nalanda, Bihar. It comprises the archaeological remains of a monastic and scholastic institution dating from the 3rd century BCE to the 13th century CE. It includes stupas, shrines, viharas (residential and educational buildings) and important art works in stucco, stone and metal. Nalanda stands out as the most ancient university of the Indian Subcontinent. Archaeological Survey of India has recognized 72 monuments in Bihar as Monuments of National Importance. Furthermore, Archaeological Survey of India has recognized 30 additional monument as protected monuments in Bihar. These monument identifier is monuments and distributed across the Bihar.

==== Archaeological ====
- Ashoka Pillars
- Baliraajgadh
- Basarh
- Bulandi Bagh
- Kumhrar
- Kesaria stupa
- Bimbisar Jail
- Maniyar Math Rajgir
- Agam Kuan
- Lauriya Araraj
- Lauriya Nandangarh
- Rampura
- Balirajgarh
- Lal Pahari Lakhisarai
- Chirand

==== Historical sites ====
- Cyclopean Wall of Rajgir
- Mahabodhi Temple
- Jal Mandir
- Sasaram
- Deo Sun Temple
- Kurkihar Hoard
- Mandar Parvat
- Brahmayoni Hill
- Pretshila Hill
- Ramshila Hill
- Thawe Mandir

==== Forts ====
- Someshwar Fort
- Rohtas Fort
- Shergarh Fort
- Jalalgarh Fort
- Raj Mahal
- Munger Fort
- Darbhanga Fort
- Deo Fort
- Buxar Fort
- Ajatshatru Fort
- Navlakha Palace
- Anandbagh Palace
- Nargona Palace

==== Inscription sites ====
- Vadathika Inscription
- Gopika Inscription
- Barabar Inscription

==== Ancient cities ====
- Nalanda
- Vikramashila
- Rajgir
- Vaishali
- Kesaria

=== Museums ===
==== History museums ====
- Bihar Museum
- Patna Museum
- Rajendra Smriti Sangrahalaya
- Gandhi Sangrahalaya, Patna
- Budha Samyak Darshan Museum and Memorial Stupa
- Begusarai Museum

==== Archaeology museums ====
- Archaeological Museum, Nalanda
- Archaeological Museum, Bodh Gaya
- Archaeological Museum, Vaishali
- Archaeological Museum, Vikramshila
- Vachaspati Sangrahālaya, Madhubani

==== Craft museums ====
- Chandradhari Museum
- Jalan Museum
- Maharajadhiraja Lakshmishwar Singh Museum

==== Science museums ====
- Patna Planetarium
- Srikrishna Science Centre
- Dr. A.P.J Abdul Kalam Science City
- Darbhanga Planetarium

== Religious tourism ==
Bihar is one of the most sacred place of various religions like Hinduism, Buddhism, Jainism, Sikhism, Many tourists travel to Bihar to visit their pilgrimage. Mahabodhi Temple, a Buddhist shrine and UNESCO World Heritage Site, is also situated in Bodh Gaya. A Mahavir Mandir, Patna having second highest budget in North India after the famous Vaishno Devi shrine.

=== Dharmic religions ===
The term 'Bihar' derives from the Sanskrit word 'Vihāra', which means abode and it itself explains the relation of Bihar with the viharas, used as the Buddhist abode. The land of Bihar is considered to be the richest one in context of Buddhism as it showered the divine light of enlightenment on a young ascetic, Siddhartha Gautama, in Bodh Gaya under Bodhi Tree. This makes Bodh Gaya is a holiest site in Buddhism and place of pilgrimage associated with the Mahabodhi Temple Complex in Gaya district in the Indian state of Bihar. The Gautama Buddha preached many sermons in different places of like Vaishali and Rajgir. Even after His Mahaprinirvana, disciples carried on the doctrine of Buddhism in the regions of Magadha, Bihar. Gautama Buddha's disciples opened several monasteries and Universities such as Nalanda University and Vikramshila University. Magadha emperor Ashoka the Great became a Buddhist and made Buddhism state religion and spread its doctrine, in different parts of India and abroad.

The capital of Bihar, Patna is one of the holiest city in Sikhism, as The tenth Guru of the Sikhs Guru Gobind Singh was born here in 1666 and spent his early years before moving to Anandpur. Patna was also honoured by visits from Guru Nanak in 1509 as well as Guru Tegh Bahadur in 1666. Takht Shri Harmandir Saheb, one of the Five Takhts of the Sikhism, is a Gurdwara situated in Patna and it is made in remembrance of the birthplace of Guru Gobind Singh, The tenth Guru of the Sikhs. Gurdwara Pahila Bara, also known as Gurdwara Ghai Ghat, is dedicated to Guru Nanak Dev, who during his visit in to Patna stayed here in 1509 and later by Guru Tegh Bahadur along with his family visited this place in 1666. Gurdwara Gobind Ghat - is where the child Guru Gobind Singh used to play with his playmates on the bank of the Ganges. It is situated on the bank of river Ganges and hardly 200 yards from Takht Shri Harmandir Saheb. It is also known as Gurdwara Kangan Ghat. Guru ka Bagh and Gurdwara Bal Leela is situated near birthplace of Guru Gobind Singh.- This place is just few meters away from Takhat Patna Sahib. Guru ji were playing with other children during his childhood. Gurdwara Bal Leela is also known as Maini Sangat. Gurdwara Handi Sahib was built in the memory of Guru Teg Bahadur. As Guru Teg Bahadur with Mata Gujri and Bala Preetam stayed here in 1728

Rajgir is birthplace of Munisuvrata, the twentieth Jain tirthankara and Pawapuri is nirvana place of Mahavira the last Jain tirthankara. Pataliputra and Vaishali is significant religious place in Jainism. Champapuri is a Jain pilgrimages where all the five kalyanaks of Lord Vasupujya have taken place. The tallest statue of Jain tirthankara Vasupujya which stands 31 feet in height was built in Champapuri in 2014. The Panch Kalyanak Pratishtha Mahotsav of the statue was done from 27 Feb to 3 Mar 2014. Kamaldah Jain Temple is the oldest Jain temple in Patna built in 18th century. This temple belonging to digambar sect of Jainism, is dedicated to Neminatha, the 22nd tirthankara. This place has traditionally been associated with the birth of the renowned Jain teacher, Sthulabhadra.

==== Hindu pilgrimages ====
- Vishnupada Temple
- Mahavir Mandir
- Sun Temple, Deo
- Ajgaibinath Temple
- Sundernath Temple
- Punaura Dham
- Jaimangla Garh Temple
- Mundeshwari Temple
- Maa Jaleshwari Temple
- Mangla Gauri Temple
- Aami Mandir
- Shitala Mata Temple
- Shyama Mai Temple
- Ahalya Sthan
- Kusheshwar Asthan
- Chandika Sthan
- Umga Sun Temple
- Maa Tara Chandi Temple
- Thawe mandir
- Haleshwar Sthan
- Ashokdham Temple
- Singheshwar Sthan
- Kapileshwar Asthan
- Tintoliya temple

==== Sikh pilgrimages ====
- Takht Shri Harmandir Saheb
- Gurdwara Pahila Bara
- Gurdwara Gobind Ghat
- Gurdwara Guru ka Bagh
- Gurdwara Bal Leela
- Gurdwara Handi Sahib
- Gurdwara Taksali Sangat
- Gurdwara Chacha Phaggu Mal
- Gurdwara Pakki Sangat
- Gurdwara Bari Sangat
- Sri Guru Tegh Bahadur Ji Chauki.
- Prakash Punj

==== Buddhist pilgrimages ====
- Mahabodhi Temple, Bodh Gaya
- Hsuen Tsang Memorial
- Patliputra Karuna Stupa
- Vishwa Shanti Stupa
- Kesariya Buddha Stupa
- Phra Ovadapatimokkha Dhammacetiya
- Metta Buddharam Temple
- Royal Bhutan Monastery
- Venu Van
- The Great Buddha statue
- Vaishali
- Nalanda
- Rajgir
- Vikramashila
- Areraj

==== Jain pilgrimages ====
- Jal Mandir, Pawapuri
- Lachhuar Jain temple
- Siddha Kshetra, Kundalpur
- Siddha Kshetra Kamaldahji
- Siddha Kshetra Mandargiri
- Champapuri
- Siddha Kshsetra Gunawaji
- Rajgir

=== Abrahamic religions ===
Maner Sharif is the place where Makhdum Daulat in 1608 died. It was then in 1616 that Ibrahim Khan, Governor of Bihar who was also his disciple, finished the construction of his mausoleum. Bihar Sharif and Phulwari Sharif is sufism center which has cultural past. Sher Shah Suri Mosque, also known as Shershahi, was built in Afghan architecture by Sher Shah Suri during1540-1545 to commemorate his reign. Pathar ki Masjid situated on the bank of the holy river Ganges in Patna and it was built by Parvez Shah, son of Jahangir, in 1621.

Virgin Mary Church, also as Padari ki haveli, is the oldest church in Bihar and it was built in 1713 in Patna by Roman Catholics. . Holy Saviour Church of Arrah is also historically important site.

In 2012, the Universal House of Justice announced the locations of the first local Baháʼí Houses of Worship that would be built. One of the specified locations was in Bihar Sharif, Bihar, India. In April 2020, the design for the Bihar Sharif House of Worship was unveiled. In February 2021, a groundbreaking ceremony for the temple was held.

==== Islam pilgrimages ====
- Maner Sharif
- Bihar Sharif
- Phulwari Sharif
- Pathar ki Masjid
- Sher Shah Suri Mosque

==== Christian pilgrimages ====
- Padri Ki Haveli
- Holy Saviour Church

==== Bahai pilgrimages ====
- Bihar Sharif

== Architectural tourism ==
Architecture of Bihar
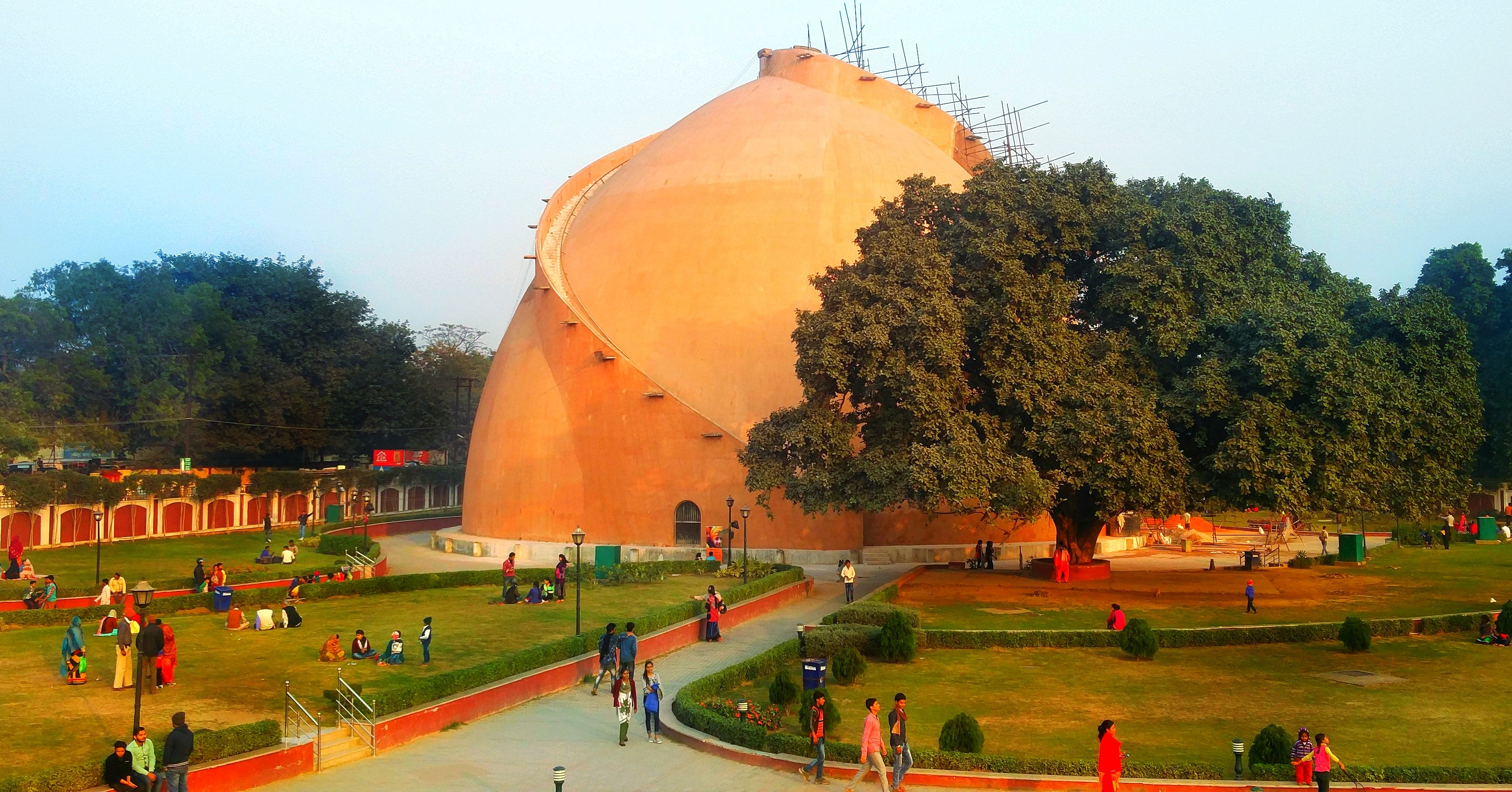
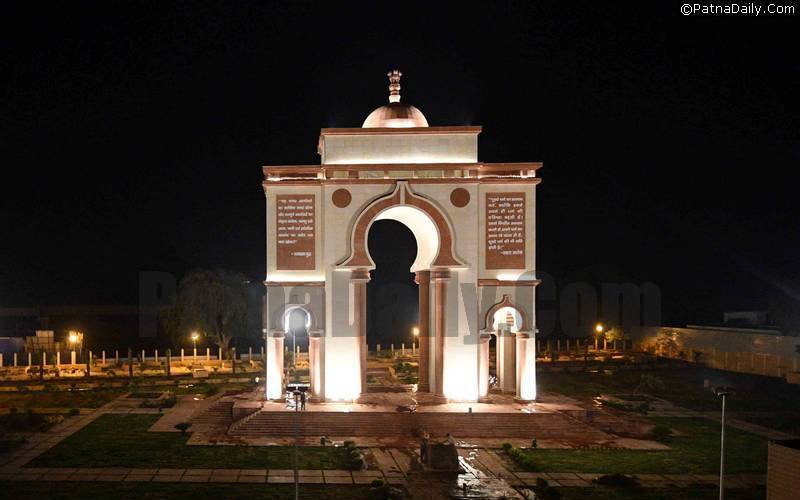
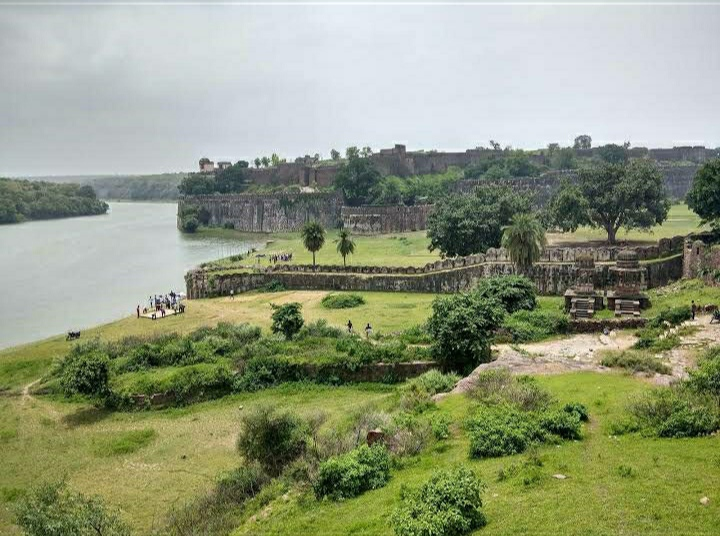
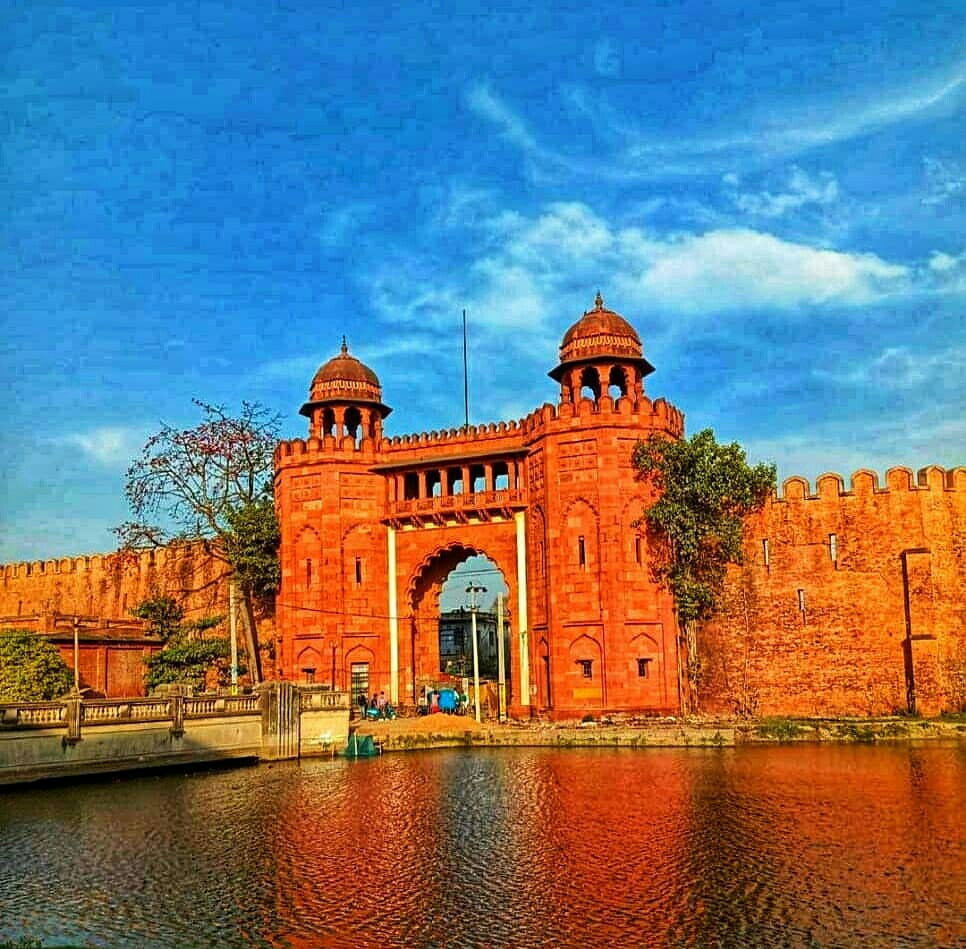
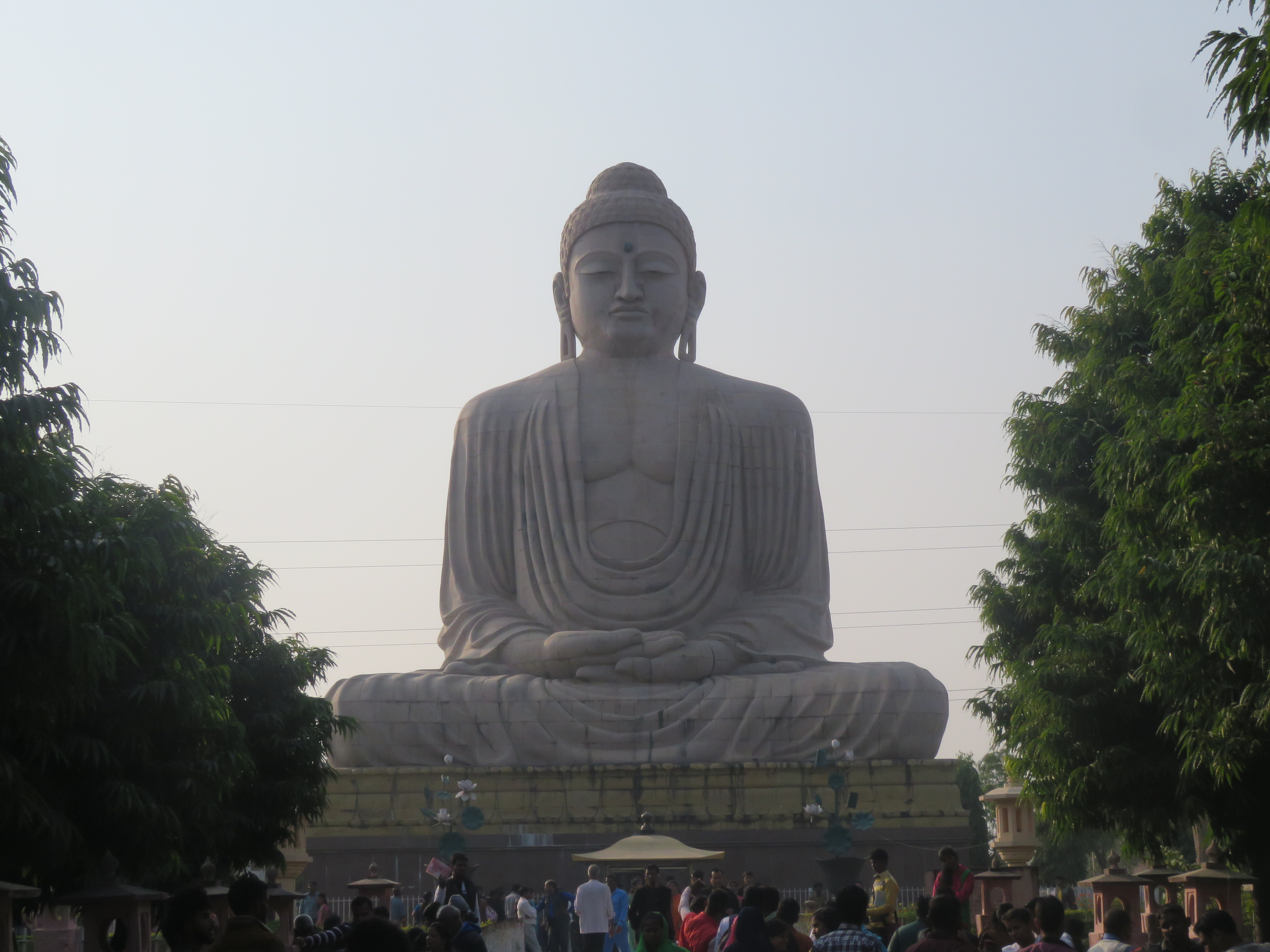
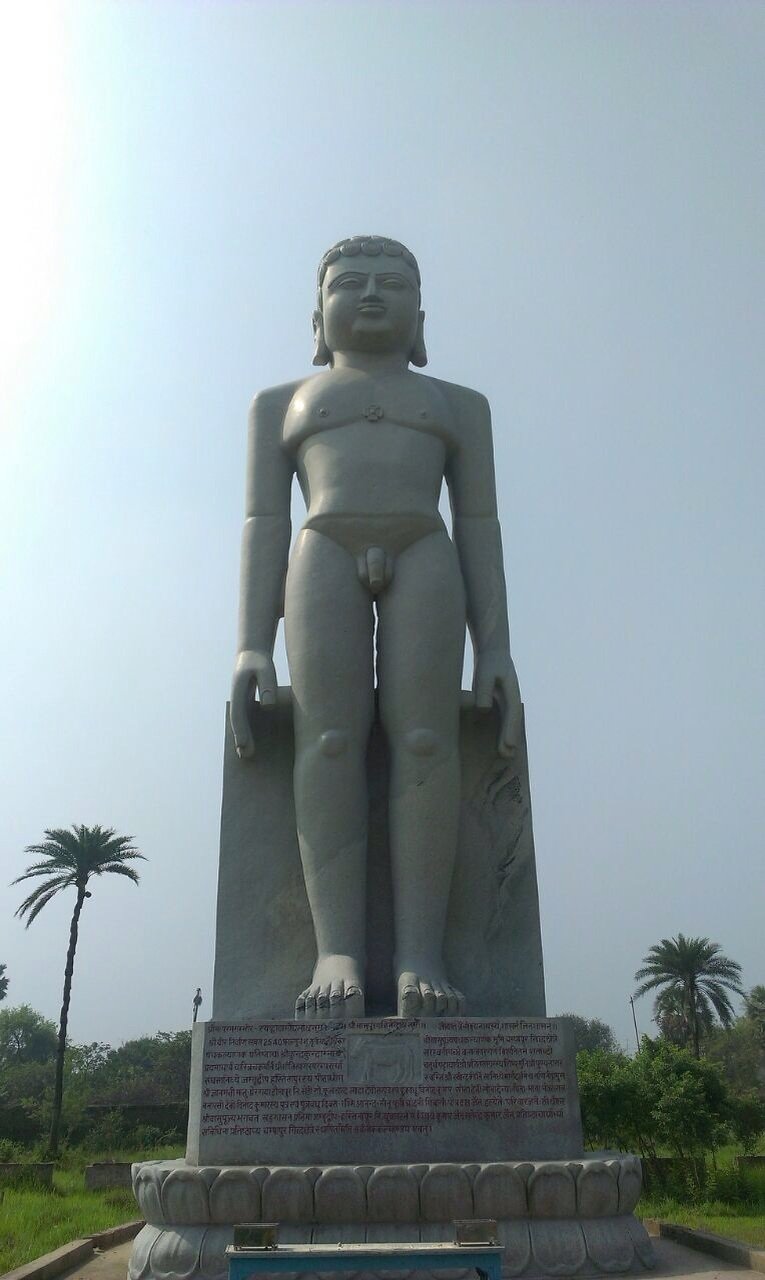
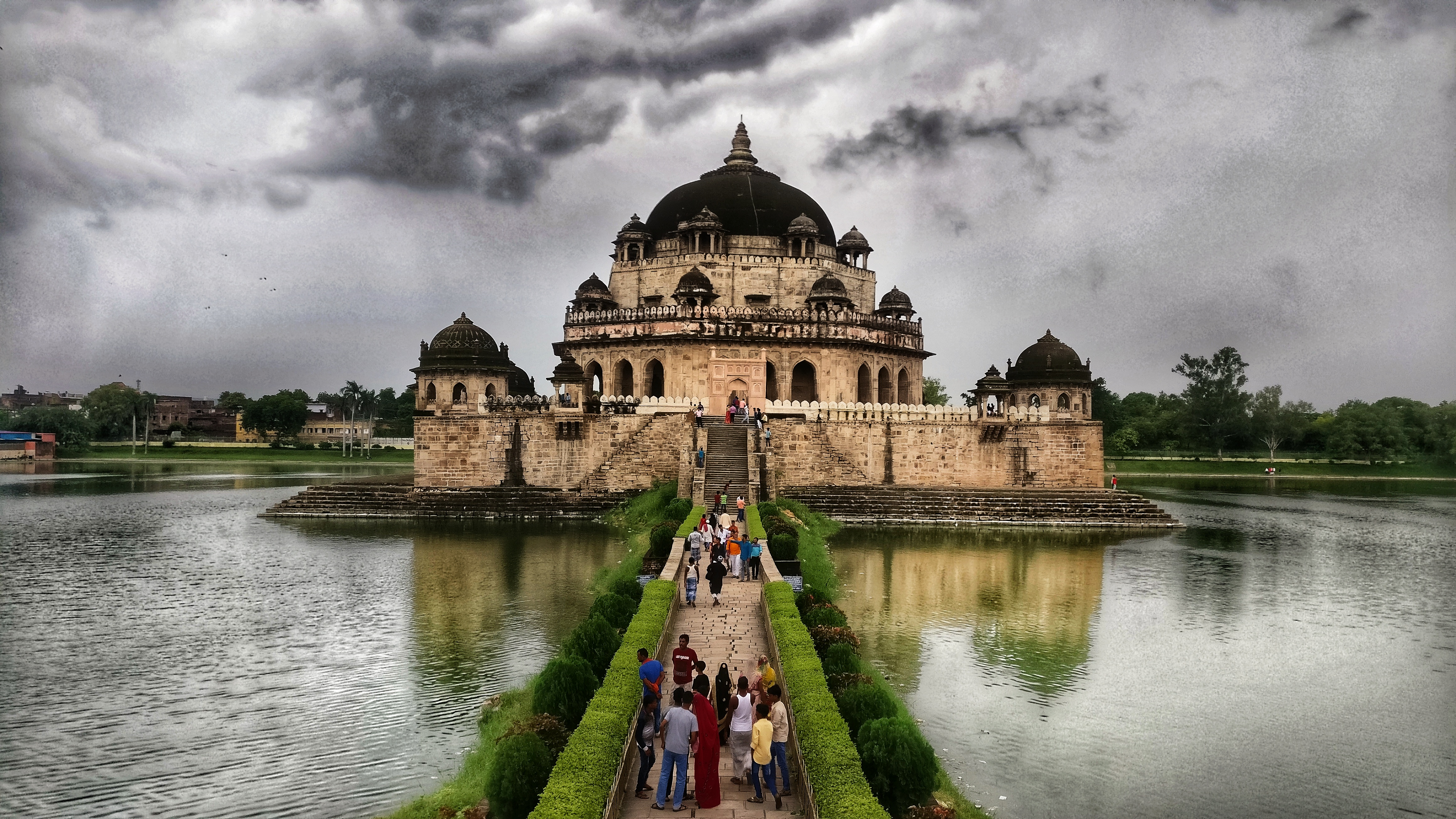
Golghar, Sabhyata Dwar, Shergarh Fort, Darbhanga Fort, Great Buddha, Vasupujya Statue, Sher Shah Suri Tomb

The first significant architectural pieces in Bihar date back to the Vedic period. While the Mauryan period marked a transition to the use of brick and stone, wood remained the material of choice. Evidence of ancient structures have been found in recent excavations in Kumrahar, in modern-day Patna. Remains of an 80-pillared hall have also been unearthed. The Buddhist stupa, a dome-shaped monument, was and is used in Bihar as a commemorative monument used to enshrine sacred relics. Many stupas, like those at Nalanda and Vikramshila, were originally built as brick and masonry mounds during the reign of Ashoka (273 BCE - 232 BCE). Fortified cities with stūpas, viharas, and temples were constructed during the Maurya Empire (c. 321–185 BCE). Guard rails—consisting of posts, crossbars, and a coping—became a safety feature surrounding a stupa. Some of Buddhist architecture blended with Roman and Hellenestic architecture to give rise to unique new styles, such as the Greco-Buddhist style. Vedic and Mauryan structure was largely suffered damage at the hands of Mughal raiders in the 12th century. Though parts of the Bihar have been excavated, much of its ancient architecture still lies buried beneath the modern city. Persian influence can be seen in surviving Mughal tombs made of sandstone and marble. Surviving Mughal architecture includes Sher Shah Suri Tomb, built by Sher Shah Suri and his successor. Ibrahim Khan, Governor of Bihar and a disciple of Makhdum Daulat, oversaw the completion of Makhdum Daulat mausoleum in 1616. Another example of Mughal architecture is the building at Maner Sharif. The domed building features walls adorned with intricate designs and a ceiling full of inscriptions from the Quran. Patna High Court, Bihar Vidhan Sabha, Bihar Vidhan Parishad, Transport Bhawan, Patna, Golghar St. Mary's Church and Patna Museum are some example of Indo-Saracenic Architectures.

=== Building ===
- Golghar
- Kargil Chowk
- Ashok International Convention Centre
- Sher Shah Suri Tomb

=== Gate ===
- Sabhyata Dwar

=== Forts ===
- Someshwar Fort
- Rohtas Fort
- Shergarh Fort
- Jalalgarh Fort
- Raj Mahal
- Munger Fort
- Darbhanga Fort
- Deo Fort
- Buxar Fort
- Navratna Palace in Champanagar
- Navlakha Palace
- Nargona Palace
- Anandbagh Palace

=== Statue ===
- Great Buddha (Bodh Gaya)
- Statue of Vasupujya

== Ecological tourism ==
=== National parks, sanctuaries, and safaris ===
National Park, Sanctuary and Safari
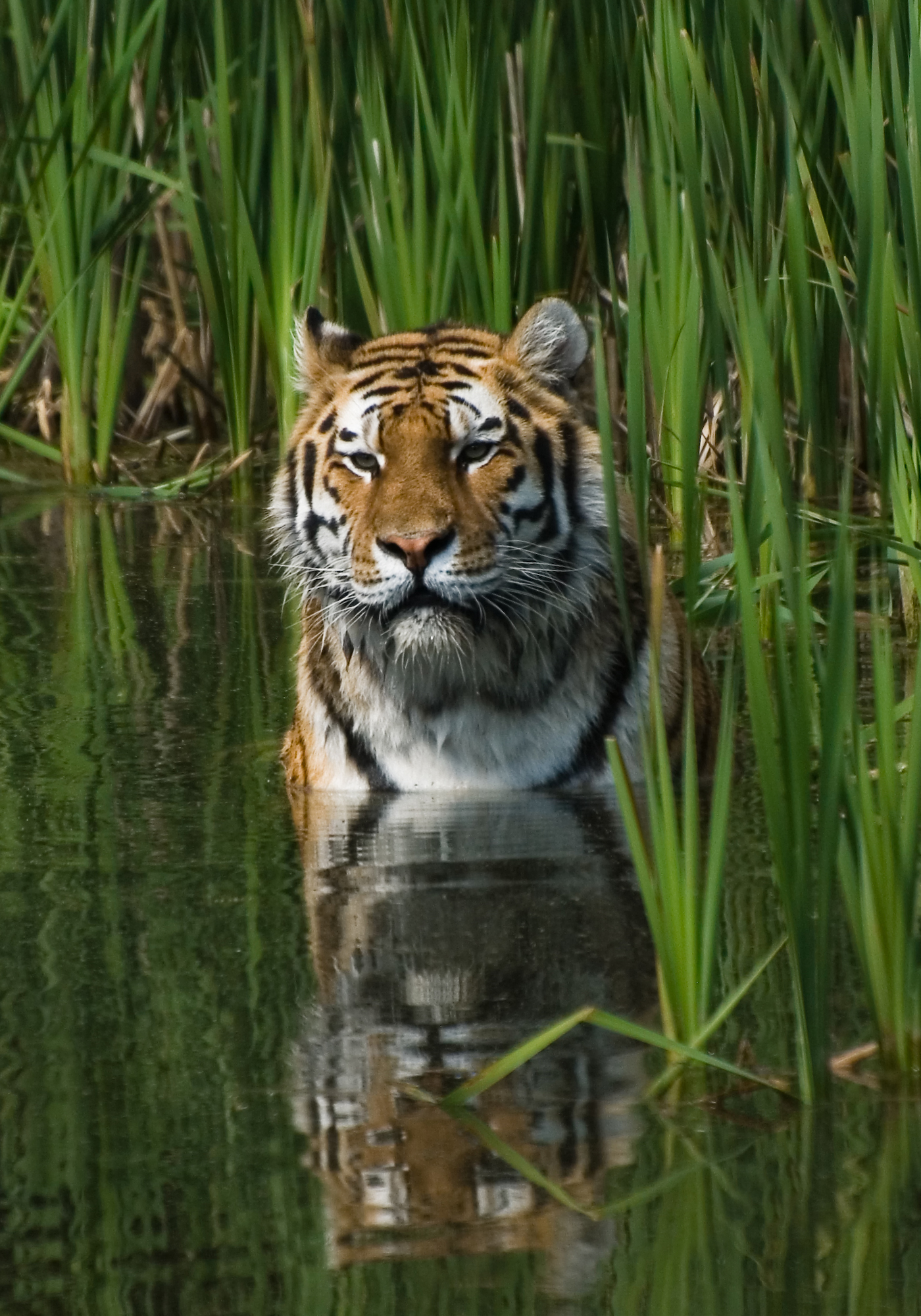
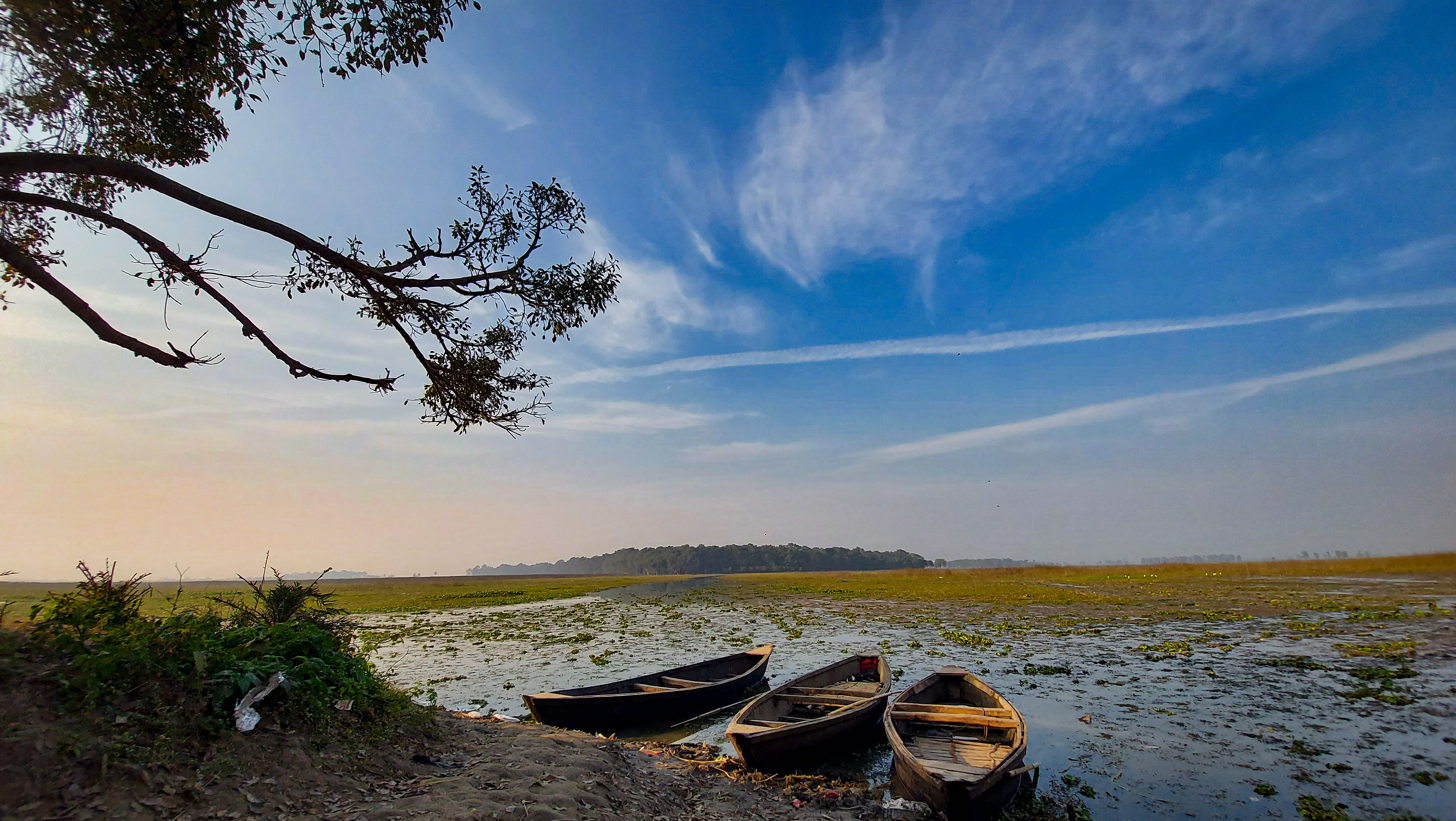
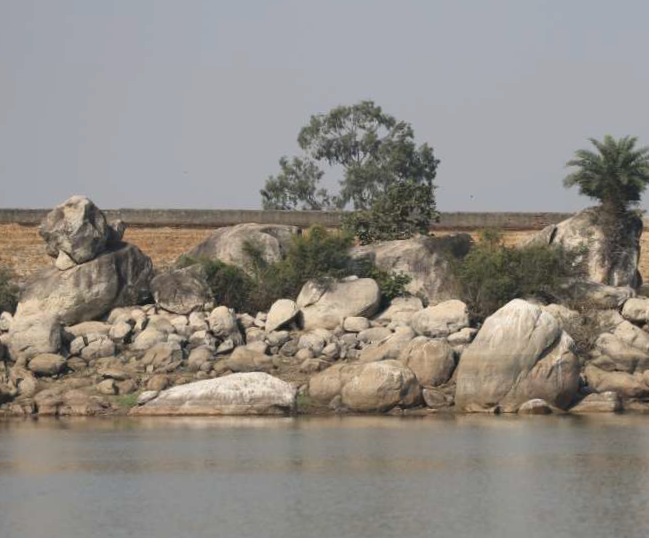
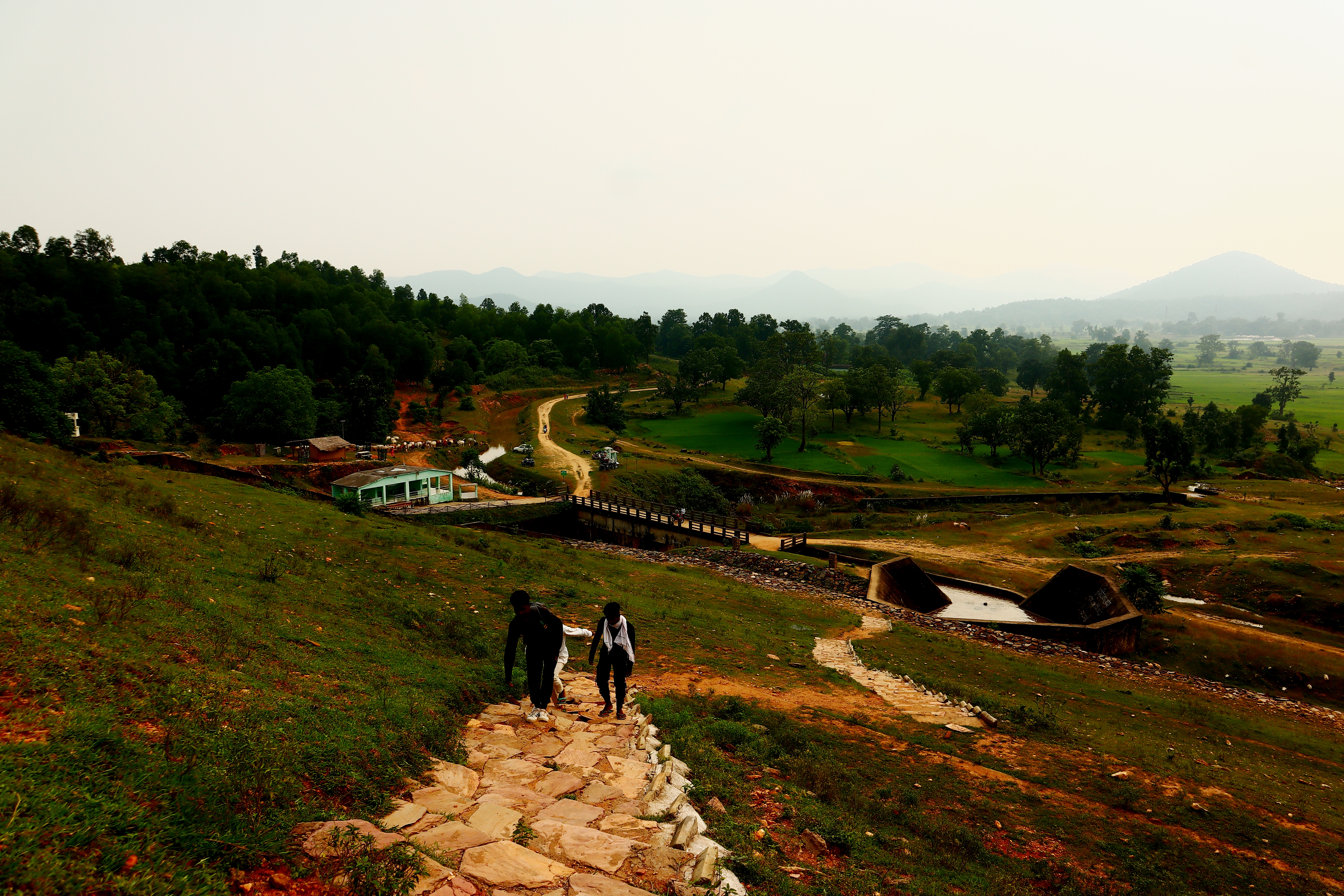
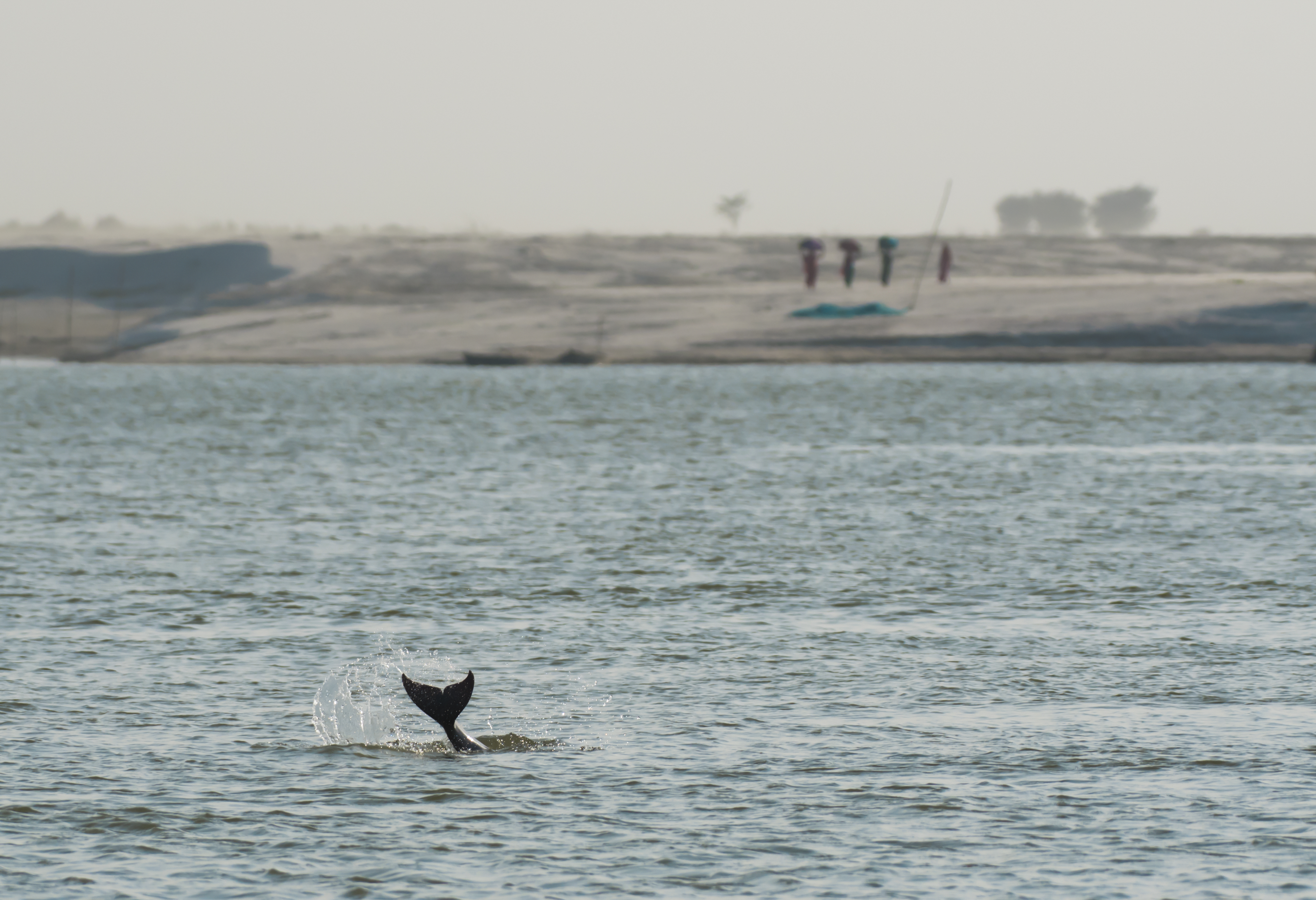
Valmiki Tiger Reserve, Kanwar Lake Bird Sanctuary, Nagi Bird Sanctuary, Nakti Dam Bird Sanctuary, Vikramshila Gangetic Dolphin Sanctuary

==== National park ====
- Valmiki National Park

==== Sanctuary ====
- Barela Bird Sanctuary
- Bhimbandh Wildlife Sanctuary
- Gautam Buddha Wildlife Sanctuary
- Kaimur Wildlife Sanctuary
- Kanwar Lake Bird Sanctuary
- Nagi Dam Bird Sanctuary
- Nakti Dam Bird Sanctuary
- Pant Wildlife Sanctuary
- Udaypur Wildlife Sanctuary
- Vikramshila Gangetic Dolphin Sanctuary
- Valmiki Wildlife Sanctuary
- Kusheshwar Asthan Bird Sanctuary

==== Safari ====
- Rajgir Nature Safari

==== Botanical and zoological park ====
- Sanjay Gandhi Jaivik Udyan
- Mega Biodiversity Park in Araria district
- Biodiversity Park, Deo in Aurangabad district

=== Water bodies ===
Lake and Waterfalls
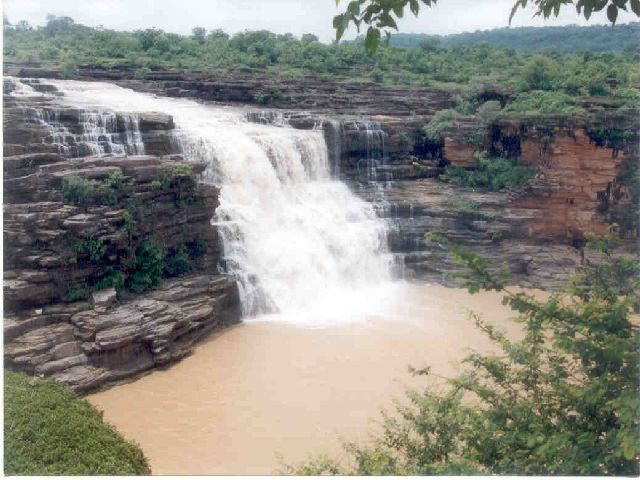
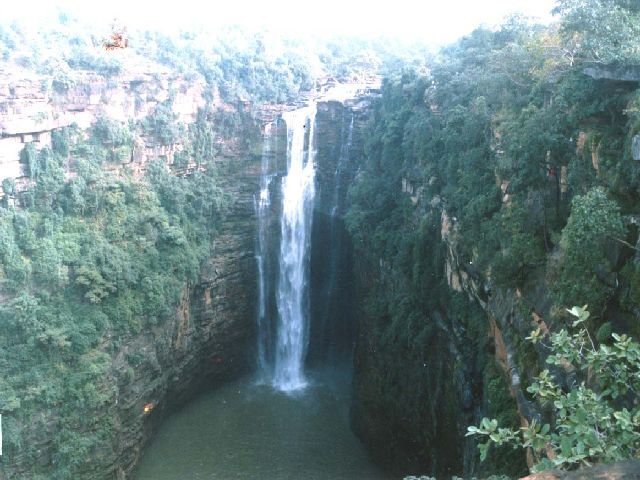
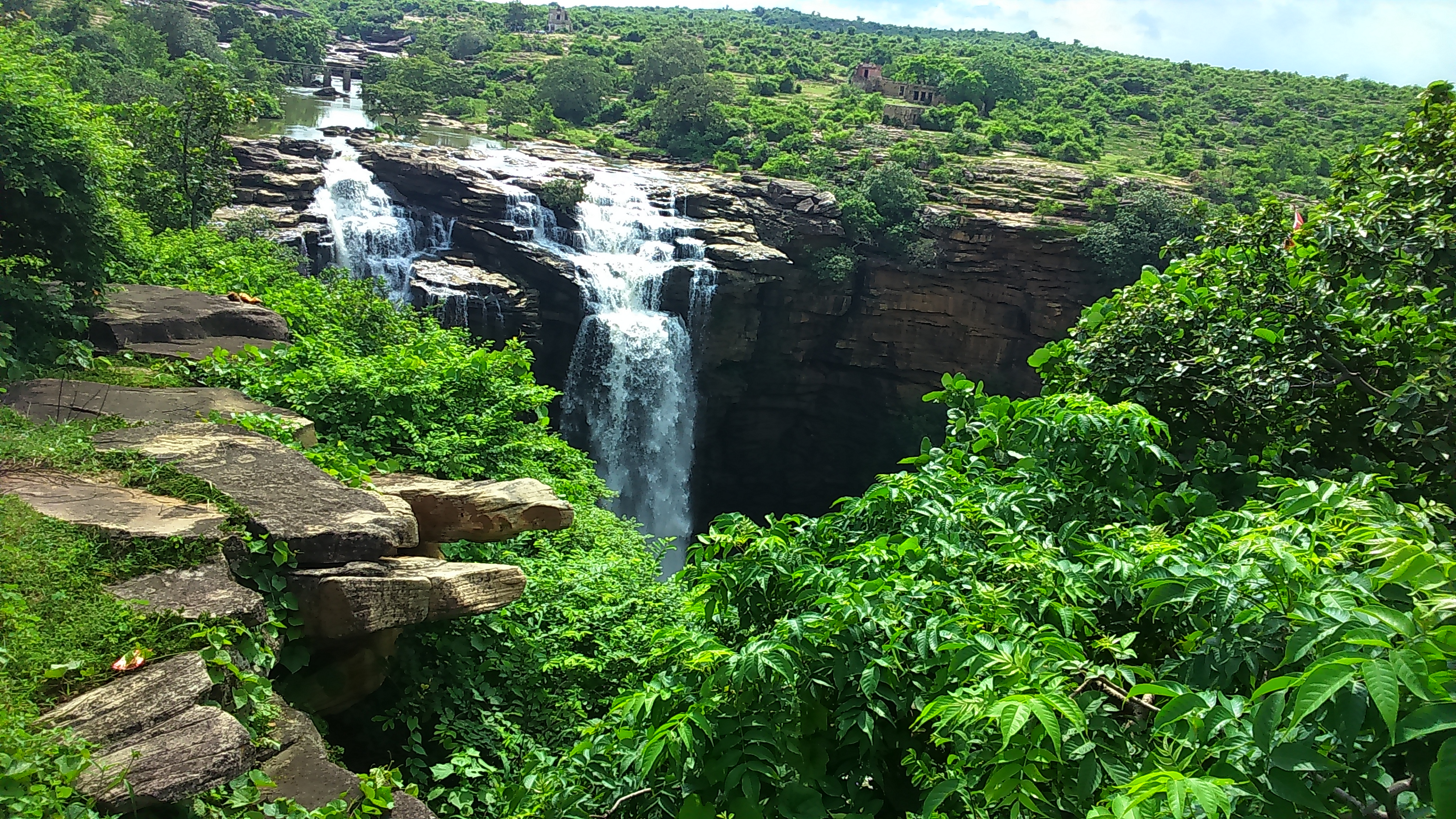
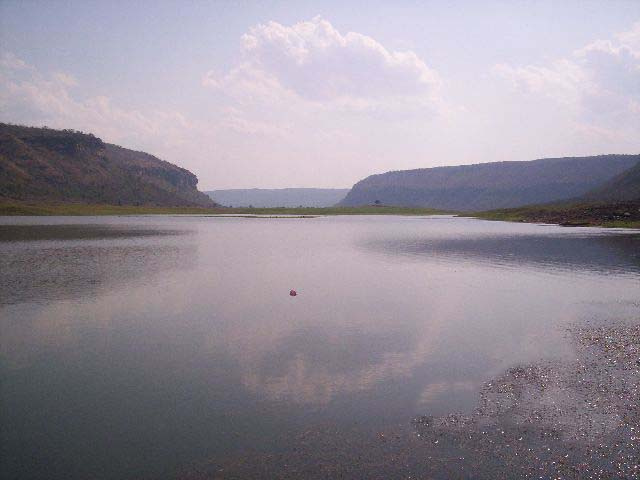
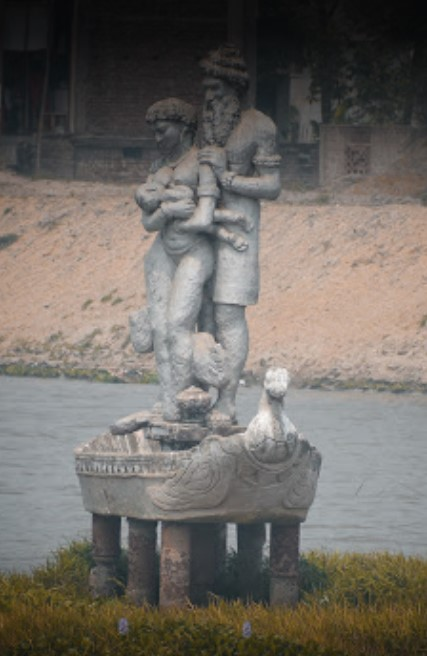
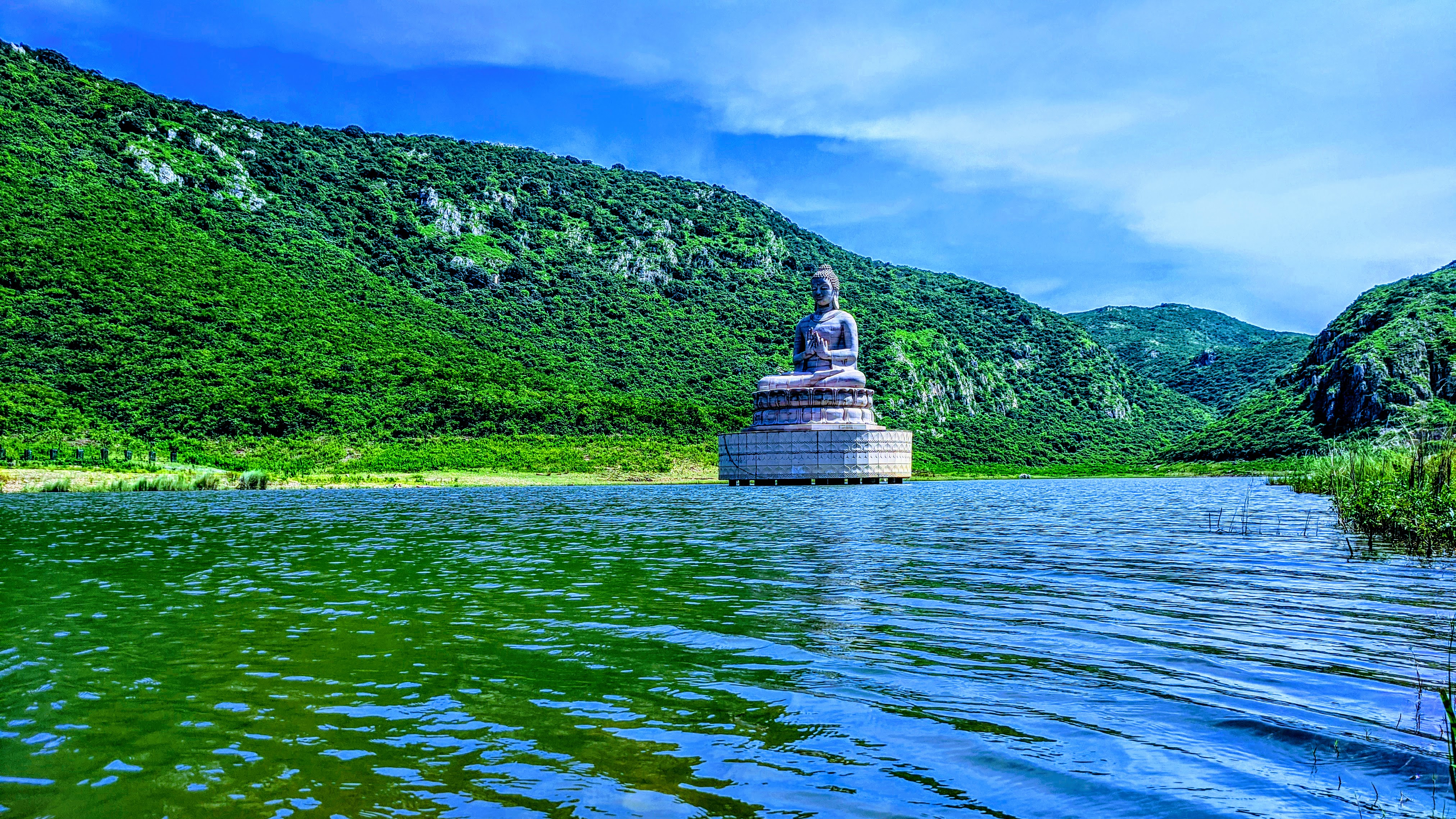
Karkat Waterfall, Telhar Waterfall, Dhua Kund, Anupam Lake, Matsyagandha Lake, Ghora Katora

==== Rivers ====
- Ajay River
- Bagmati
- Budhi Gandak
- Bhutahi Balan
- Gandak
- Ganges
- Ghaghra
- Phalgu
- Gandaki River
- Kamala
- Karmanasha
- Koshi River
- Mahananda River
- Mohana
- Punpun
- Sapt Koshi
- Son River

==== Waterfalls ====
- Dhua Kund Falls
- Kakolat Waterfall
- Karkat Waterfall
- Madhuvdhandam Falls
- Manjhar Kund Waterfall
- North Tank Waterfall
- Telhar Waterfall
- Tutla Bhawani Waterfall
- Kashish Waterfall

==== Springs (hydrosphere) ====
- Manjhar Kund
- Dhua Kund
- Sita Kund
- Surya Kund
- Brahmakund
- Rishi Kund
- North Tank
- Gautam Kund

==== Lakes ====
- Anupam Lake
- Kharagpur Lake
- Kanwar Lake
- Ghora Katora
- Gogabil Lake
- Matsyagandha Lake

==== Ponds ====
- Mangal Talab
- Pandu Pokhar

==== Dams and reservoirs ====
- Indrapuri Barrage

=== Hills and caves ===
Hills
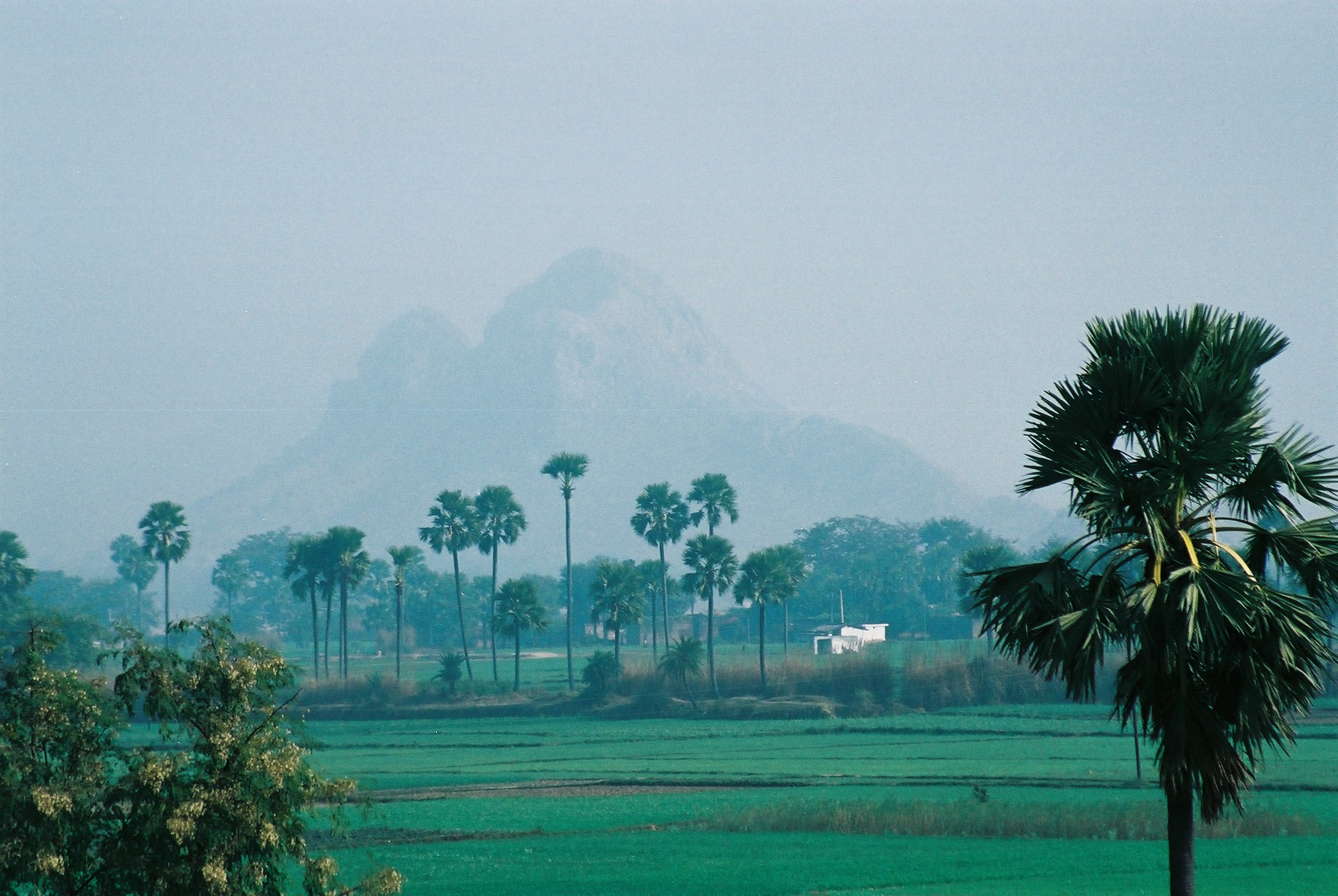
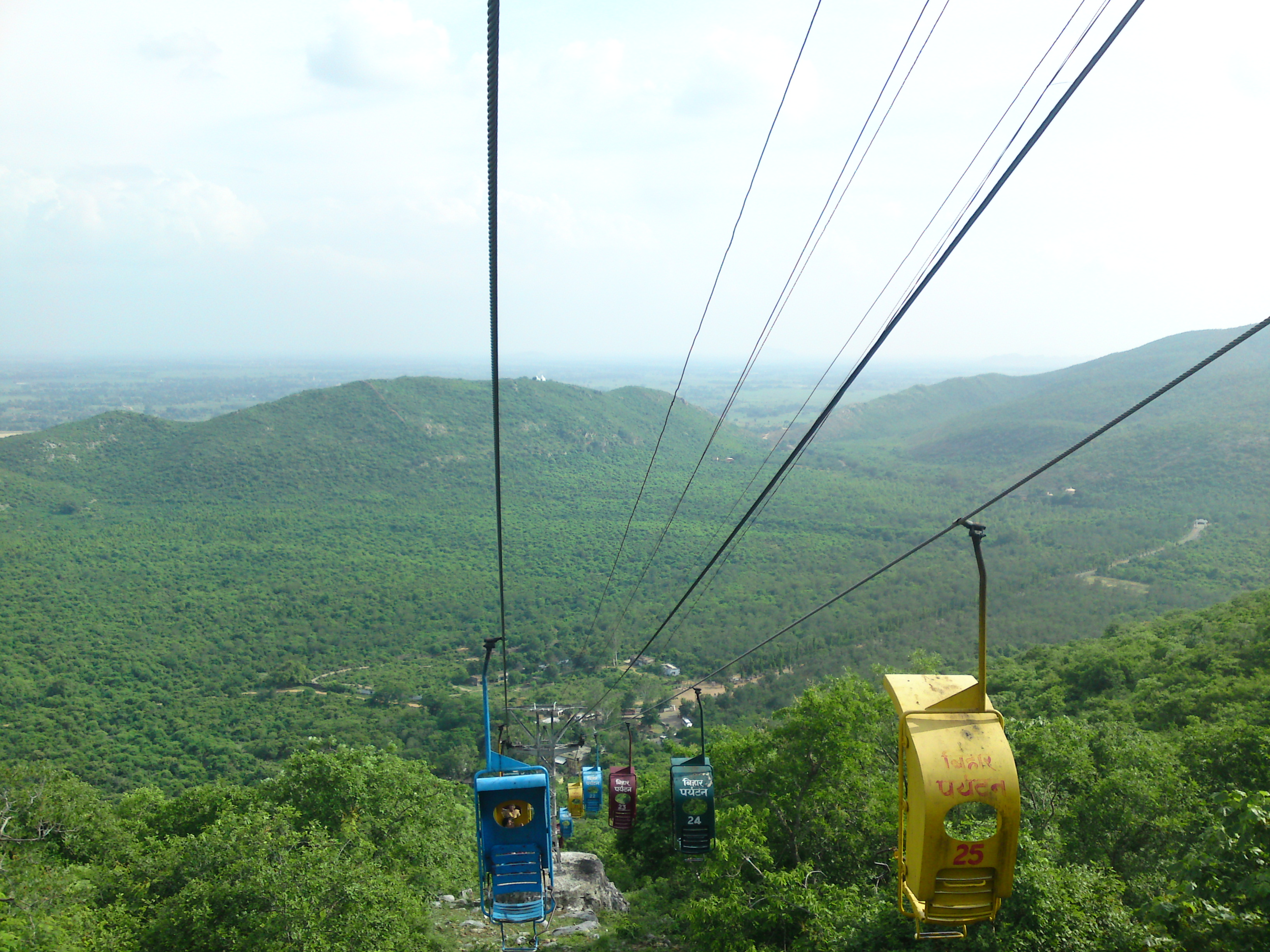
Hills in Gaya, Rajgir Hills
Caves
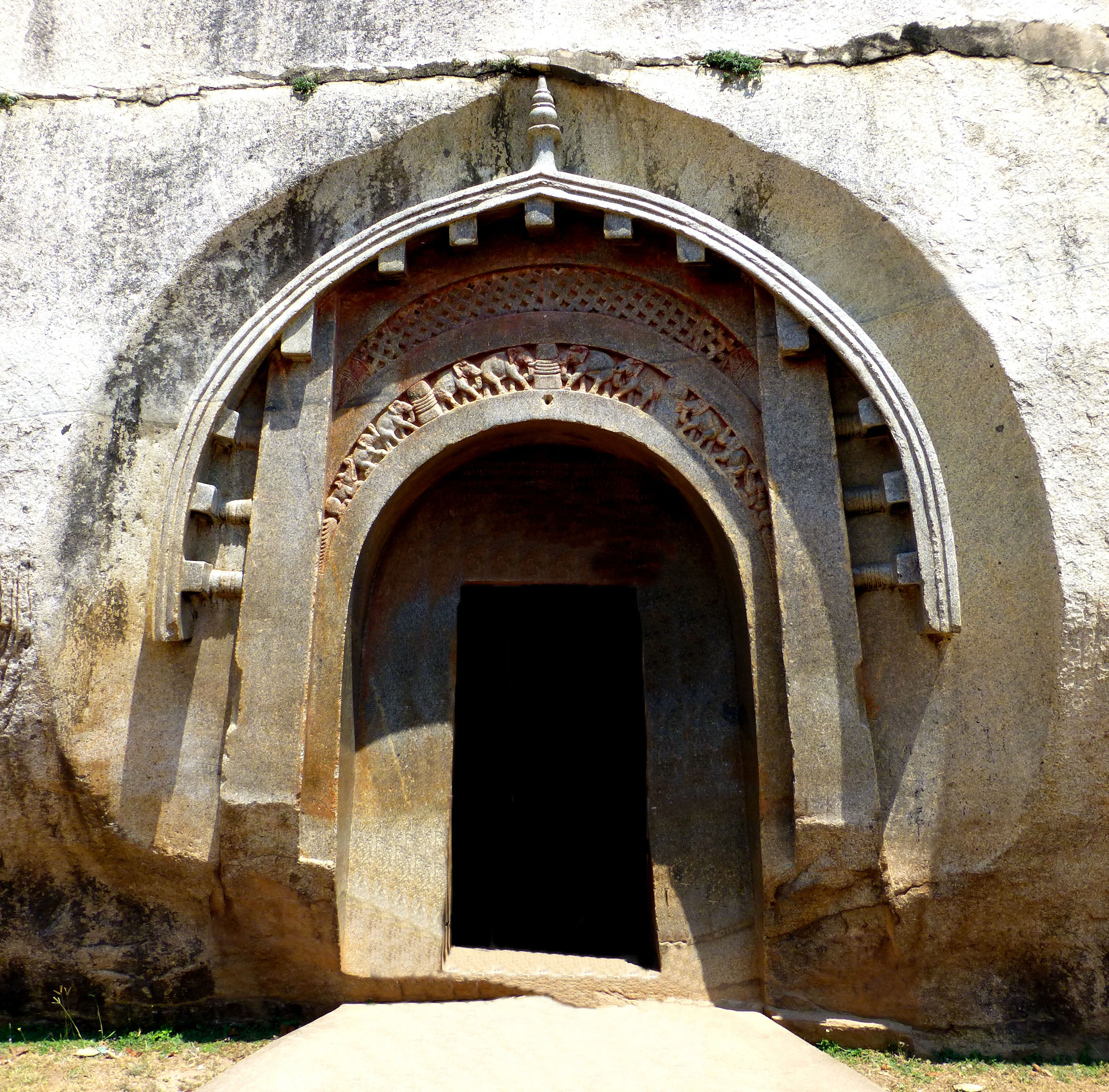
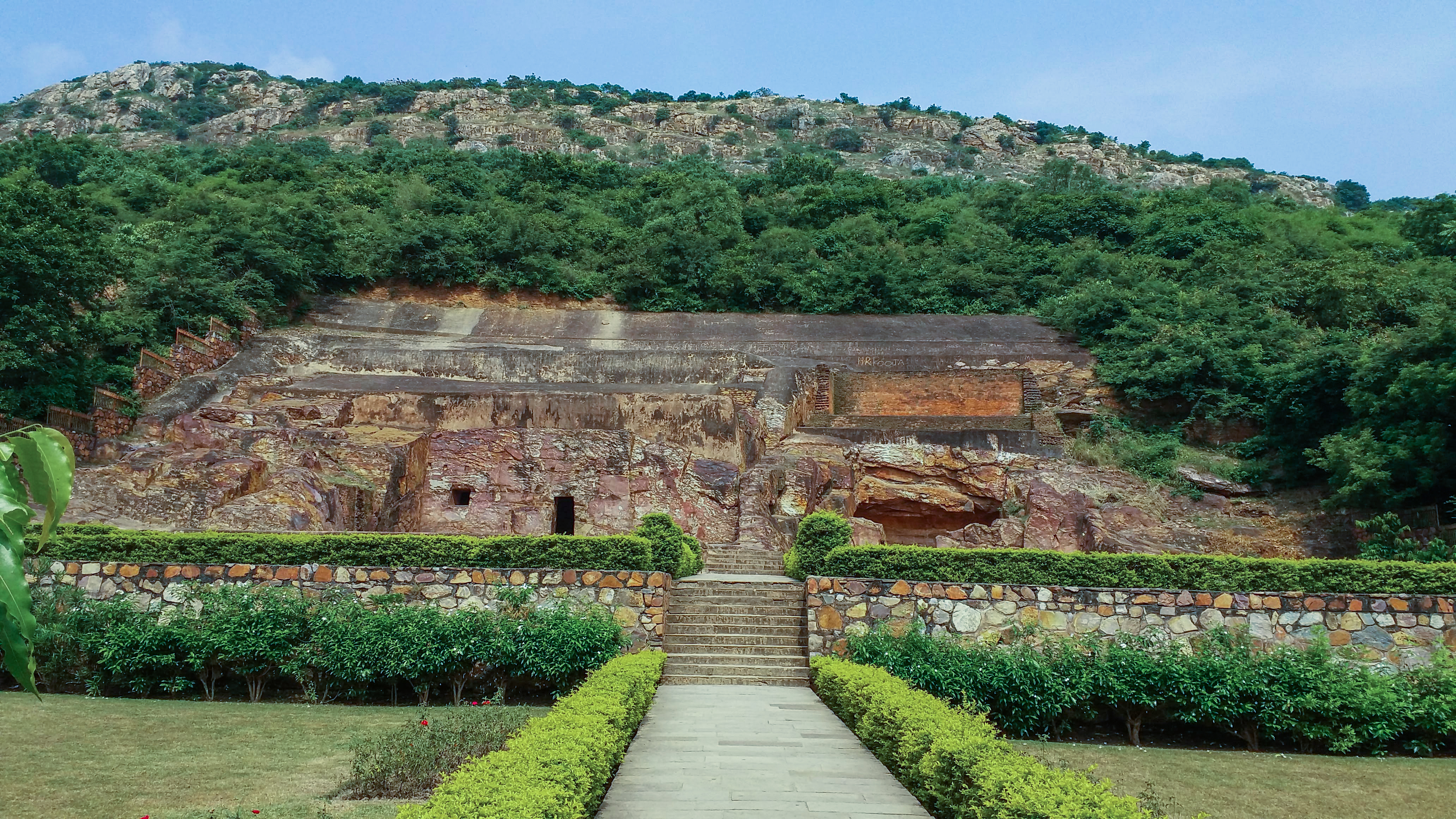
Lomas Rishi Cave, Son Bhandar Caves

==== Hills ====
- Barabar Hills
- Brahmayoni Hills
- Brahmajuni Hills
- Bateshwar Hills
- Dungeshwari Hills
- Gridhakuta Hills
- Gurpa Hills
- Kavadol Hills/Kauvadol
- Kaimur Range
- Mandar Hills
- Mundeshwari Hills
- Nagarjuni Hills
- Pretshila Hills
- Pragbodhi Hills
- Ramshila Hills
- Rajgir Hills
- Ramshila Hills
- Vaibhar Hills

==== Caves ====
- Barabar Caves
- Bateshwar cave
- Dungeshwari Cave
- Gopika Cave
- Indasala Caves
- Lomas Rishi Cave
- Mahakala caves
- Patalpuri Caves
- Pippala cave
- Saptaparni Cave
- Sattaparnaguha Cave
- Son Bhandar Caves
- Sitamarhi Cave
- Vadathika Cave

== Adventure tourism ==
- Pandu Pokhar

== Event tourism ==
Fair and Festival
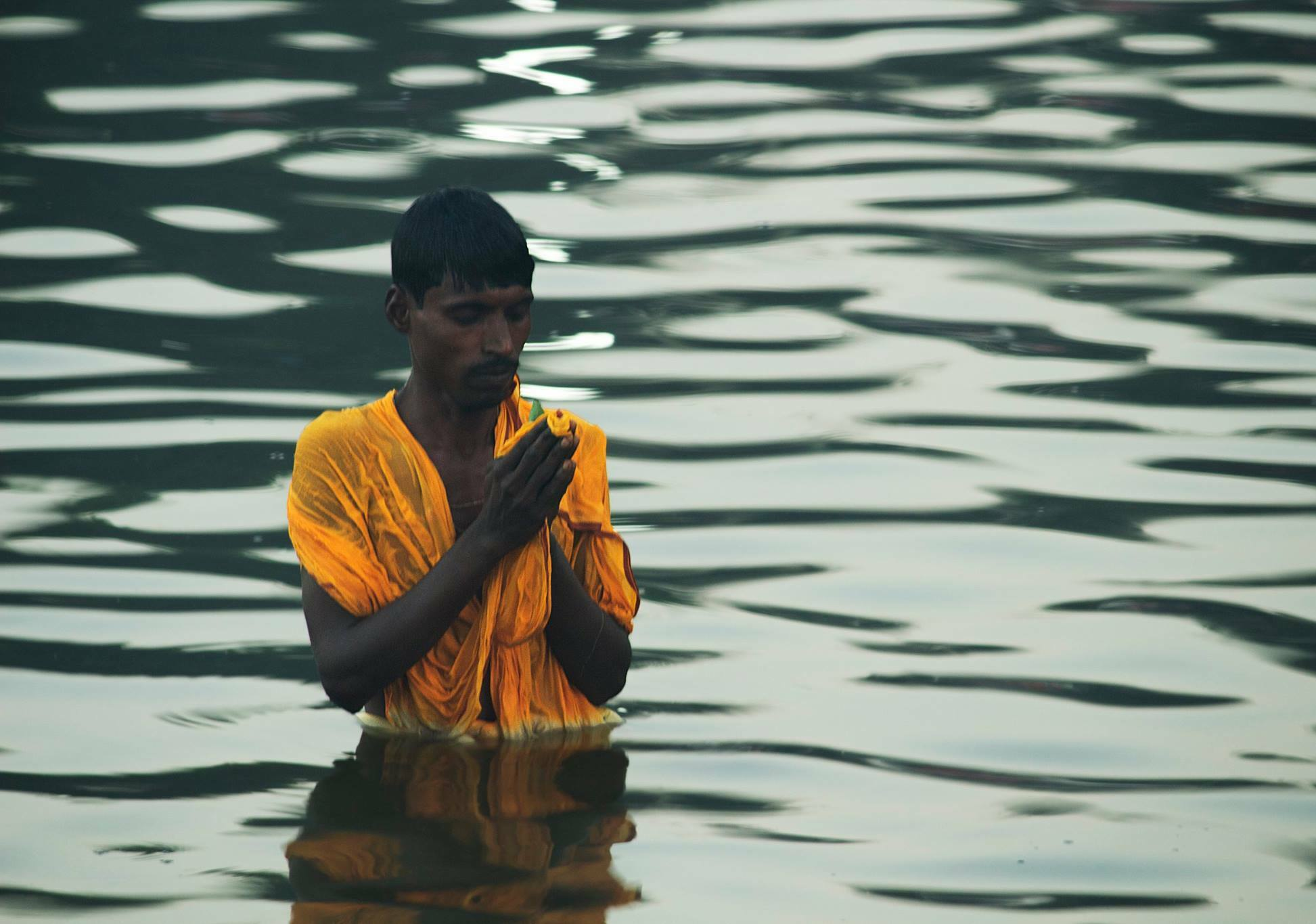
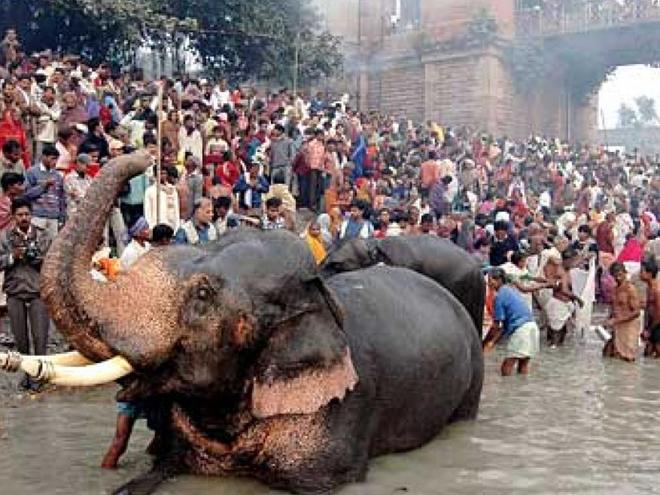
Chhath, Sonepur Cattle Fair

Chhath, a is an ancient and major Vedic festival celebrated in Bihar. It is celebrated twice a year: once in the summers, called the Chaiti Chhath, and once around a week after Deepawali, called the Karthik Chhath. The Karthik Chhath is more popular because winters are the usual festive season in Bihar.

=== Fair ===
- Cattle Fair, Sonepur
- Pitru Paksha, Gaya

=== Cultural events ===
- Rajgir Mahotsav
- Patliputra Natya Mahotsav
- Patna Sahib Mahotsav
- Patna Film Festival
- Darbhanga Film Festival
- Bodhisattava International Film Festival

=== Traditional festivals ===
- Chhath
- Sama Chakeva
- Jivitputrika
- Jur Sital

== Educational tourism ==
In the past, tourism in the region was purely based on educational tourism, as Bihar was home of some prominent ancient universities like Nalanda and Vikramashila.

== Tourists ==
Number of tourists visiting Bihar
Year	Tourists			% Growth (YoY)			State rank	
Year	Domestic	Foreign	Total	Domestic	Foreign	Total	Domestic	Foreign
2001	6061168	85673	6146841	-	-	-		
2002	6860207	112873	6973080	▲+13.18	▲+31.75	▲+13.44		
2003	6044710	60820	6105530	▼-11.89	▼-46.12	▼-12.44		
2004	8097456	38118	8135574	▲+33.96	-37.33	▲+33.25		
2005	6880685	63321	6944006	▼-15.03	▲+66.12	▼-14.65		
2006	10670268	94446	10764714	▲+55.08	▲+49.15	▲+55.02		
2007	10352887	177362	10530249	▼-2.97	▲+87.79	▼-2.18		
2008	11889611	345572	12235183	▲+14.84	▲+94.84	▲+16.19		
2009	15784679	423042	16207721	▲+32.76	▲+22.42	▲+32.47		
2010	16042725	540686	16583411	▲+1.63	▲+27.81	▲+2.32		
2011	18397490	972487	19369977	▲+14.68	▲+79.86	▲+16.80		
2012	21447099	1096933	22544032	▲+16.58	▲+12.80	▲+16.39		
2013	21588306	765835	22354141	▲+0.66	▼-30.18	▼-0.84		
2014	22544377	829508	23373885	▲+4.43	▲+8.31	▲+4.56		
2015	28029118	923737	28952855	▲+24.33	▲+11.36	▲+23.87		
2016	28516127	1010531	29526658	▲+1.74	▲+9.40	▲+1.98		
2017	32414063	1082705	33496768	▲+13.67	▲+7.14	▲+13.45		
2018	33621613	1087971	34709584	▲+3.73	▲+0.49	▲+3.62		7
2019	33990038	1093141	35083179	▲+1.10	▲+0.48	▲+1.08	15	▼9

== Connectivity and access ==
Bihar is also an important transit point for the tourists dropping in from the other states of India. Bihar is well-connected by air, rail and road transport.

- By air

Patna has its own airport known as Lok Nayak Jayaprakash Airport or Airport Patna. It is a national airport and it is connected to all major cities of India via daily flights. Gaya Airport is the only international airport in Bihar and Jharkhand which 96 km from Patna. It is an international airport which is connected to Colombo, Sri Lanka through two airline operators: Bangkok, Thailand, Singapore, and Bhutan.Third Domestic Airport is Darbhanga Airport.

- By rail

Bihar is strategically located in the main line of the East Central Railway and therefore connected with important cities of India and most cities within Bihar.

- By road

The cities of Bihar are well connected by public transport including both private and government transport. The cities are interconnected as well as connected with the capital. The roadways also connected to adjacent states and regular bus service is available for different cities of adjacent states like Jharkhand, West Bengal, Uttar Pradesh. The roadways also connects to Nepal. To boost the state roadways, the state government have introduced Mercedes-Benz luxury buses. The Mercedes luxury buses, 92 in number, ply between 17 routes including Patna, Bhagalpur, Gaya, Ranchi and Jamshedpur.

== See also ==
- Tourism in Patna
- Tourism in India
- Tourism in North East India
- List of World Heritage Sites in India
- List of national parks of India
- List of lakes of India
- List of waterfalls in India
- List of State Protected Monuments in India
- List of beaches in India
- Incredible India
- List of Geographical Indications in India
- Medical tourism in India
- List of botanical gardens in India
- List of hill stations in India
- List of gates in India
- List of zoos in India
- List of protected areas of India
- List of aquaria in India
- List of forts in India
- List of forests in India
- Buddhist pilgrimage sites in India
- Hindu pilgrimage sites in India
- List of rock-cut temples in India
- Wildlife sanctuaries of India
- List of rivers of India
- List of mountains in India
- List of ecoregions in India
- Coral reefs in India
- List of stadiums in India
