= Mokar =

- Village
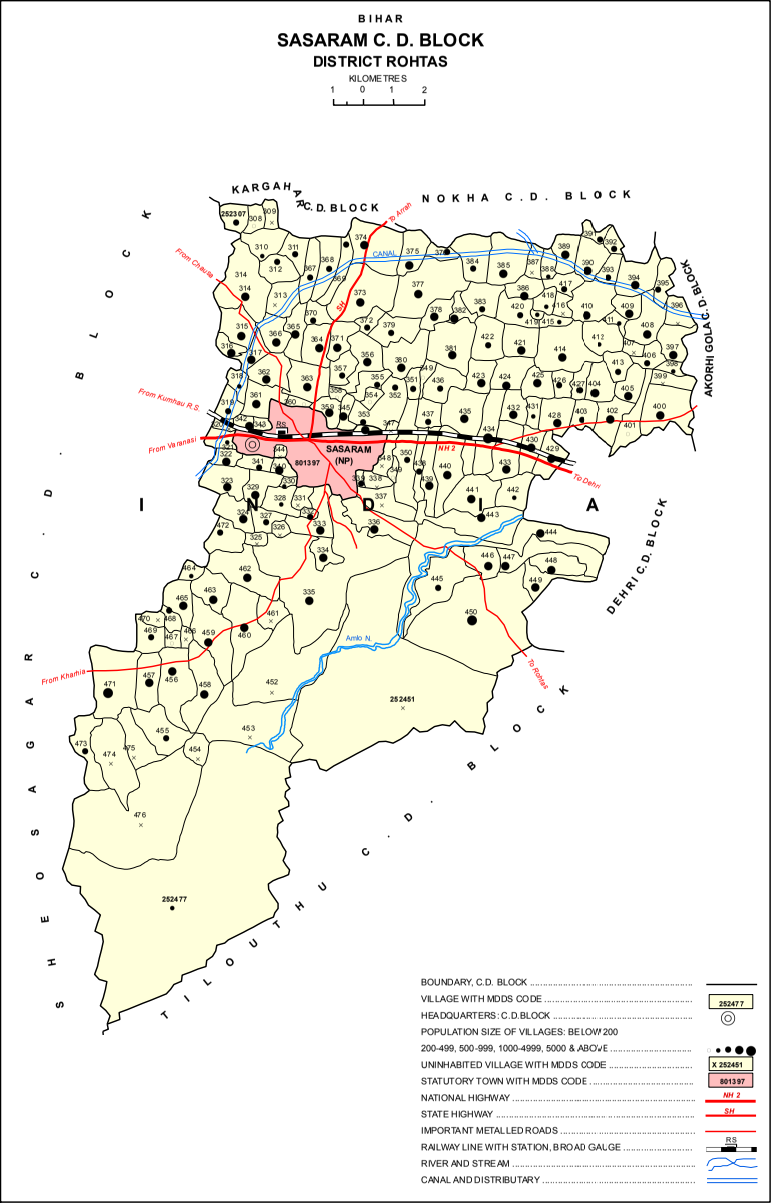
- Map showing Mokar (#373) in Sasaram block.

- Location in Bihar, India Mokar (India)
- Coordinates: 24.95°N 84.03°E
- Country: India
- State: Bihar
- Region: Patna
- District: Rohtas
- Block: Sasaram
- Gram Panchayat: Mokar
- Ward: 13 wards
- Elevation: 111 m (364 ft)

Population (2011)
  - Total: 3,409

Languages
  - Spoken: Bhojpuri, Hindi English, Urdu
- Time zone: UTC+5:30 (IST)
- PIN: 821113
- Telephone code: 06184
- Vehicle registration: BR-24
- Sex ratio: 1,841 - 1,568 ♂/♀

Mokar is a Village located in Sasaram tehsil of Rohtas district in Bihar, India. It is situated 5 km away from Sasaram, which is both district & sub-district headquarter of Mokar village. As per 2009 stats, Mokar village is also a gram panchayat.

== Administration ==
Mokar is one of the 160 villages under the administrative region of Sasaram block in Rohtas district. Chhedi Paswan is the incumbent Member of Parliament from Sasaram and Jawahar Prasad (BJP) is the Member of legislative Assembly from Sasaram.

== Demography ==
=== Population and Sex Ratio ===
Mokar is a large village located in Sasaram of Rohtas district, Bihar with total 618 families residing. The Mokar village has population of 3409 of which 1841 are males while 1568 are females as per Population Census 2011.

In Mokar village population of children with age 0-6 is 539 which makes up 15.81% of total population of village. Average sex ratio of Mokar village is 852 which is lower than Bihar state average of 918. Child Sex Ratio for the Mokar as per census is 827, lower than Bihar average of 935.

=== Literacy Rate ===
Mokar village has higher literacy rate compared to Bihar. In 2011, literacy rate of Mokar village was 77.77% compared to 61.80% of Bihar. In Mokar male literacy stands at 86.29% while female literacy rate was 67.82%.

As per constitution of India and Panchyati Raaj Act, Mokar village is administrated by Sarpanch (Head of Village) who is elected representative of village.

== Facilities ==
=== Mokar Post office ===
A Post office is established in the village by the Government to provide the postal services throughout the nearby area.
Jurisdiction - Mokar Gram Panchayat
Address : Mokar Post Office, Sasaram, Rohtas, Bihar, India, PIN - 821113

=== Mokar Pax ===
Pax of the Mokar Gram Panchayat is located in Mokar. All the Central Government Services under Public Distribution System is regularly implemented by the Pax to the beneficiaries throughout the Gram Panchayat.

=== Primary Health Centre Akashi ===
To provide the Primary health care services to the villagers there is a Primary Health Centre in 3 km far from the village Mokar

=== Anganwadi Centre Mokar ===
There is an Anganwadi Centre in the village to provide primary health care to the mothers and children below age 6.

=== DRCC ===
Student credit card, AADHAAR card, and other online work is available for students.

== Transportation ==
Rail Network

1. Mokar (Sasaram Railway Station → Gaya Railway Station → Sasaram or Patna → Sasaram Junction railway station → Mokar) is the nearest railway station. Mokar is 5 km South - North of Sasaram, Private cabs are easily available from Sasaram to Mokar.
2. Varanasi (Mokar→ Varanasi) is nearly 85 km away from Mokar. From Varanasi mod take any public transport or private cab to reach Sasaram via NH 2, From Sasaram take any private cab to Mokar via Sasaram_Ara_Road

Road Network

1. From Varanasi Bus Stand, Varanshi to Sasaram, via NH2
2. From Patna Bus Stand, Patna to Sasaram
3. From Gaya Bus Stand, Gaya to Sasaram, via NH2 or

By Bus Sasaram Bus Stand to Mokar

== Work Profile ==
In Mokar village out of total population, 1196 were engaged in work activities. 40.47% of workers describe their work as Main Work (Employment or Earning more than 6 Months) while 59.53% were involved in Marginal activity providing livelihood for less than 6 months. Of 1196 workers engaged in Main Work, 52 were cultivators (owner or co-owner) while 238 were Agricultural labourer.

== See also ==
- Sasaram
- Rohtas district
- Government of Bihar
- Panchayati raj (India)
- Maa Tara Chandi Temple
- Manjhar Kund
- Dhua Kund
- Bihar
