= Maa Tara Chandi Temple =

Hindu Temple in Sasaram, Bihar

Maa Tara Chandi Mandir
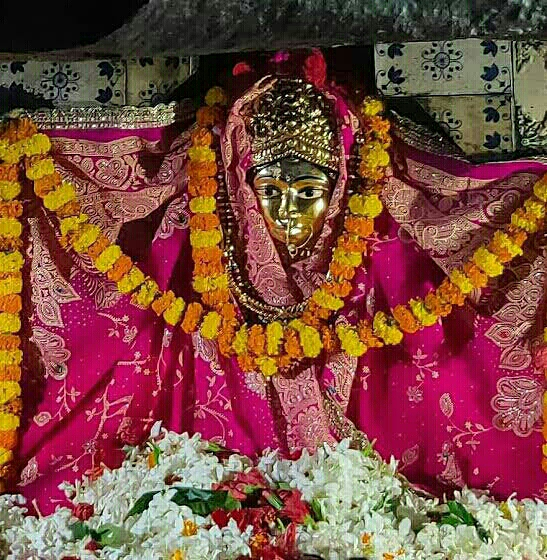

- Location in Bihar Location in India

Religion
- Affiliation: Hinduism
- Deity: Durga maa Sati, Adi Parashakti, Shakti, Devi, Kali, Parvati, Tara
- Festivals: Navratri, Maha Shivaratri
- Governing body: Maa Tara Chandi Temple Committee, Sasaram

Location
- Location: Sasaram
- State: Bihar
- Country: India
- Coordinates: 24.95°N 84.03°E

Architecture
- Type: Cave temple, mountain temple
- Completed: Dvapara Yuga

Specifications
- Temple: 1
- Elevation: 110 m (361 ft)

Maa Tara Chandi Temple is a Hindu temple dedicated to Maa Shakti or Maa Durga, located in Sasaram, Bihar, India. It is one of the 51 Shakta pithas.

== History ==
Maa Tarachandi Shakta pitha, also called Maa Tarachandi, is the oldest and one of the most sacred temples of Sasaram. It is regarded as one of the 51 Siddha Shakta pithas in India. Maa tara chandi is a kuldevi of the surwar rajput(gaur dynasty) who are presently living as a royal family of Namudag Mahuari state. According to Pauranic legends, the "right eye" (Netra) of the corpse of Sati had fallen here when it was chopped off by Lord Vishnu with his "Sudarshan Chakra". The ancient temple, originally called Maa Sati, is believed to be the abode of the goddess Durga Maa Tara Chandi.

The Kaimur Hills provide an access to many other attractions of Sasaram like Gupta Mahadev Temple, Parvati Temple, ancient caves, Manjhar Kund and Dhua Kund are two waterfalls of this town that have the capacity of generating large amounts of electricity.

== Ancient ==
The right eye (netra) of Maa Sati is believed to have dropped here, so the name Tarachandi. It is also said that when Gautama Buddha came here after getting enlightenment, Maa Tarachandi had given him darshan in the form of a girl child. then he was directed to go to Sarnath, where Buddha had preached for the very first time. Known to give moksha, the mode of worship is satvik. It is said that Goddess Lakshmi showers those with prosperity who pray here.

== Shakta pithas ==
The Shakta pitha (Sanskrit: शाक्त पीठ, Śakta Pīṭha, seat of Shakti is a place of worship consecrated ashes of the goddess Shakti or Sati, the female principal of Hinduism and the main deity of the Shakta sect. They are sprinkled throughout the Indian subcontinent.

== Rituals ==
- Nitya Puja
- Shriangar
- Aarti
- Bhog (Halwa puri)
- Shayana Aarti

== Location ==
There is a temple of Goddess Tarachandi, about 5 km (3.1 mi) from Sasaram two miles to the south, and an inscription of Pratapdhavala on the rock close to the temple of Chandi Devi. Hindus in large number assemble to worship the goddess. Dhuwan Kund, located about 5.1 km (3.2 mi) south-west of this town, is a nearby tourist attraction.

== See also ==
- Mundeshwari Temple
- Jaleshwari Temple
- Daksha
- Shiva
