= Maharorh =

- Village
- Location in Bihar, India Maharorh (India)
- Coordinates: 25°14′16″N 84°6′6″E
- Country: India
- State: Bihar
- District: Rohtas
- Elevation: 87.78 m (288.0 ft)

Population
  - Total: 18,000

Languages
  - Official: Bhojpuri, Hindi
- Time zone: UTC+5:30 (IST)
- PIN: 802213
- Telephone code: 500
- ISO 3166 code: IN-BR
- Vehicle registration: BR-
- Coastline: 500 kilometres (310 mi)
- Nearest city: Sasaram
- Sex ratio: 1:1 ♂/♀
- Literacy: 55%%
- Lok Sabha constituency: Buxar
- Climate: Humid Subtropical (Köppen)
- Avg. summer temperature: 46 °C (115 °F)
- Avg. winter temperature: 2.8 °C (37.0 °F)
- Website: www.maharorh.com

Maharorh is a village in Rohtas district, Bihar state, India. Maharorh is a gram panchayat. The language spoken in Maharorh is Bhojpuri. Agriculture is the main occupation.

== Overview ==
There is one government school up to class eight. There is one post office and a branch of Bank of India. The village produces eggplant, tomato and peppermint.

== Transport ==
This village is well connected with road to Dehri and Sasaram, and has a big railway station with almost all the major trains stopping there. Sasaram is well connected with Ara by rail as well as road.
