= Tomb of Hasan Khan Suri =

Coordinates: 24°56′55″N 84°00′52″E

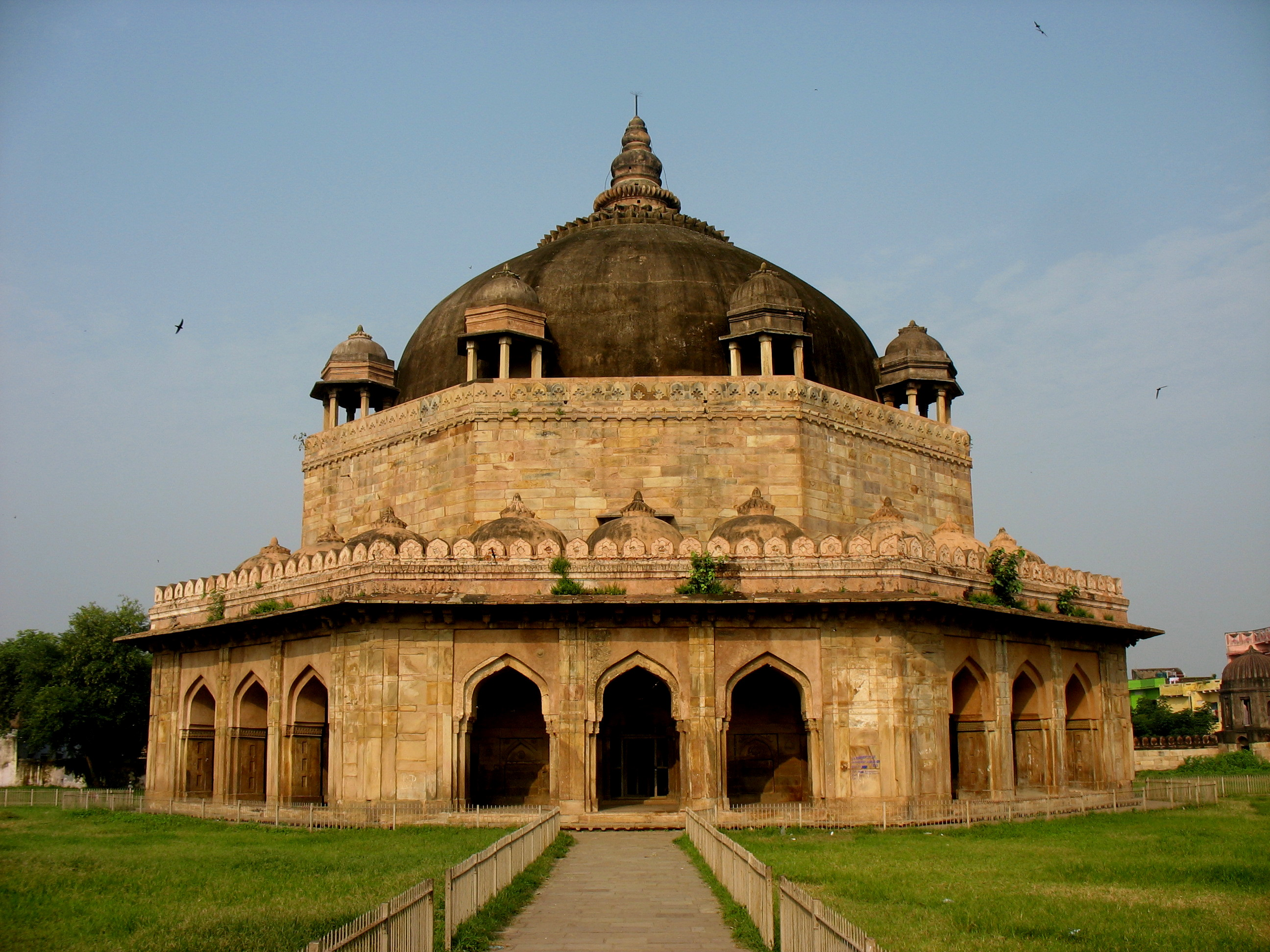
- Interactive map of the Tomb of Hasan Khan Suri area

General information
- Location: Sasaram

Technical details
- Material: sandstone

The Tomb of Hasan Khan Suri, also known as Sukha Rauza, is a tomb in Sasaram, Bihar, India. It is listed as a monument of national importance. (Note: The tomb is attributed to "Hasan Shah Suri" in the ASI list. However, Hasan Khan never assumed the title of Shah, which is a royal title)

== History ==
Hasan Khan Suri, was a jagirdar and the father of Sher Shah Suri founder of the Sur Empire. Hasan died around 1526, and his original tomb was probably a simple building. Later, Sher Shah constructed the present structure.

The inscription within the tomb does not give its date of construction, but it does state that the tomb was built by Sultan Sher Shah. This indicates that the monument could not have been built earlier than 1538, as that was the year Sher Shah assumed the royal title of sultan.

British scholar Percy Brown dates the tomb to about 1545.

The tomb was designed by Aliwal Khan.

== Description ==
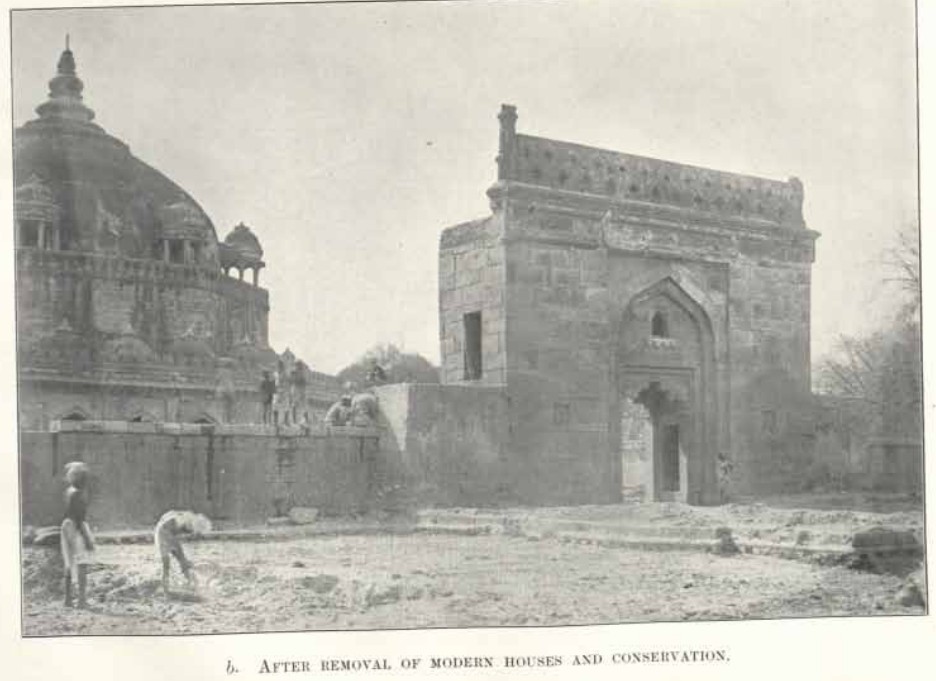
Tomb of Hasan Khan Suri and its monumental gateway, circa 1916

The tomb is built in the Afghan style architecture, and considered a forerunner and model to the Tomb of Sher Shah.

=== Exterior ===
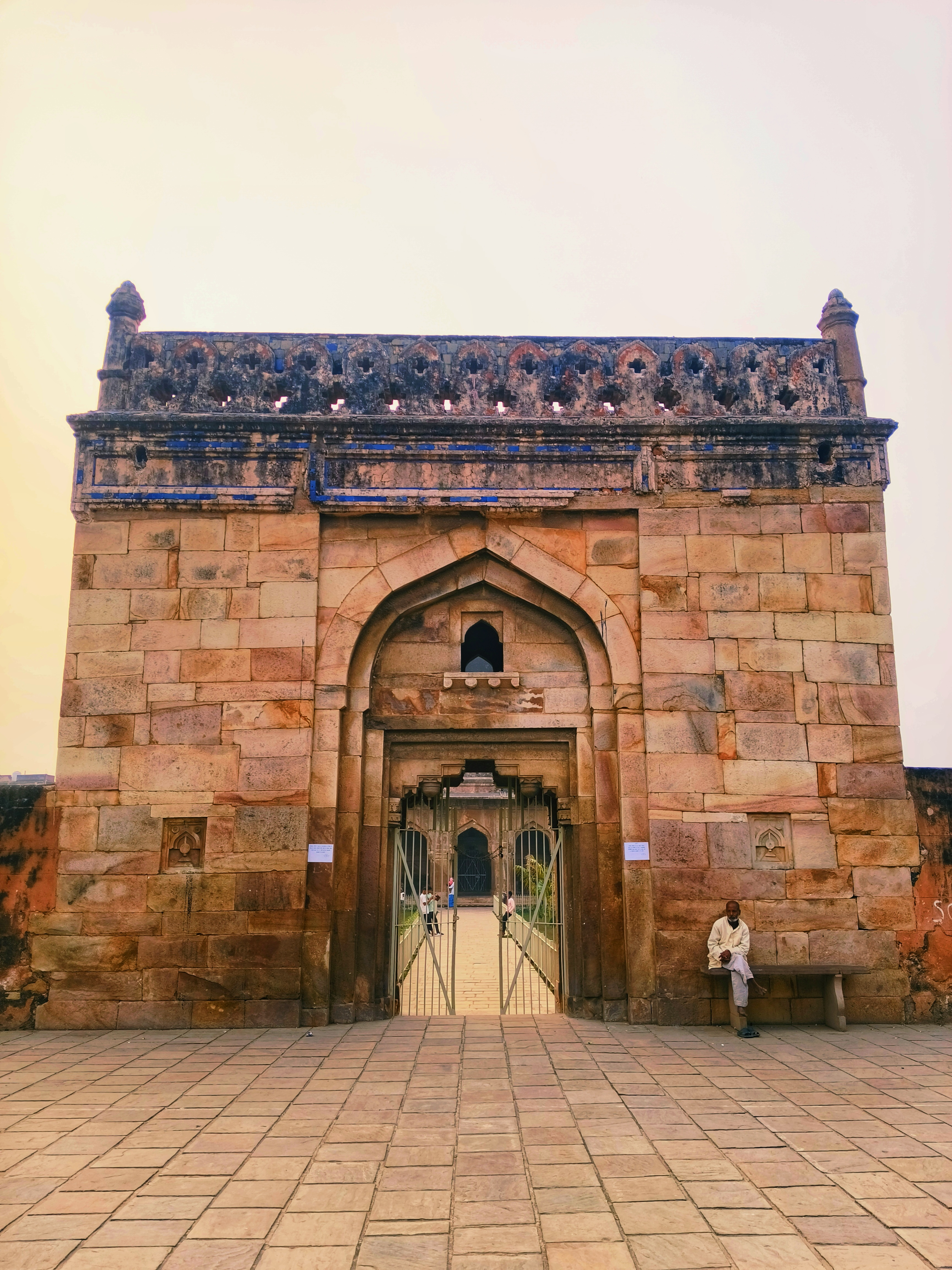
Gateway

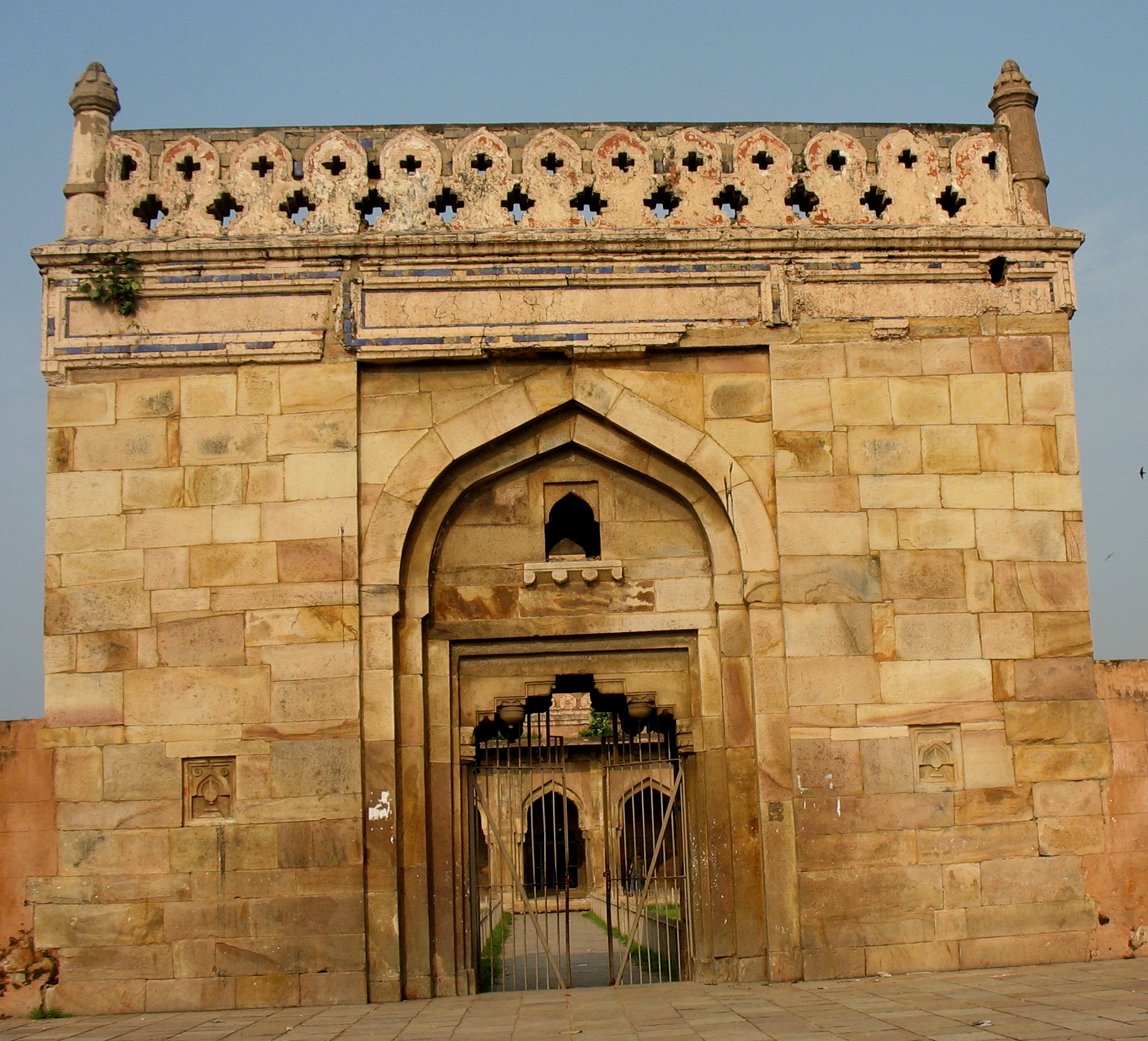
Gateway

The tomb is located close to the Tomb of Sher Shah Suri. It is situated in a square walled enclosure, with a large gateway in the middle of each side. A stepwell and mosque are also located within the enclosure.

Built in the Afghan style, the tomb is octagonal in shape. A single-storied verandah runs along the entirety of the tomb, with three arched openings on each side. A large dome surmounts the building, and is surrounded by ornamental chhatris.

=== Interior ===
The mihrab is located on the western wall. The inscription located over the mihrab in Naskh script reads:

There is no god but God and Muhammad is the Prophet of God. (In the reign of) Faridd'd-Din-wad-dunya, Abul Muzaffar, Sher Shah, the sultan, was built, this dome (gummat) of the revered Miyan Hasan (at) the request of Shaikh Abu Sarwani
