= Gopal Narayan Singh University =

- Seal of GNSU
- Other name: GNSU
- Motto: विद्याधनं सर्वधनं प्रधानम्
- Motto in English: Knowledge is wealth, and the foremost wealth.
- Type: State Private University
- Established: 15 June 2018 (8 years ago)
- Affiliations: UGC
- Chancellor: Gopal Narayan Singh
- Vice-Chancellor: Dr. Jagdish Singh
- Visitor: Dr. Harikesh Singh
- Location: Jamuhar, Bihar, India
- Campus: 80 acres (32 ha)
- Website: www.gnsu.ac.in

Gopal Narayan Singh University (GNSU) is a state private university located at Jamuhar village near the city of Sasaram in Rohtas district, Bihar, India. It is one of the first six private universities in Bihar. The university was notified in the Bihar Gazette following a decision of the Bihar cabinet on 5 June 2018 and has an official establishment date of 15 June 2018.

== Departments and faculties ==
- Faculty of Medicine
- Faculty of Nursing
- Faculty of Pharmacy
- Faculty of Management Studies
- Faculty of Information Technology
- Faculty of Agriculture
- Faculty of Law
- Department of Commerce
- Department of Mass Communication & Journalism
- Department of Library & Information Sciences

== Campuses ==
The following institutes are listed as "campuses" of the institute:

- Narayan Medical College and Hospital
- Narayan Nursing College
- Narayan Academy of Managerial Excellence
- Narayan Institute of Pharmacy
- Narayan Institute of Agricultural Sciences
- Narayan School of Law
- Narayan Paramedical Institute & Allied Sciences

== Infrastructure ==
The campus infrastructure consists of halls of residence for students, residential accommodation for faculty and staff, several food courts and cafeterias built to the highest standards of hygiene, gym, and fitness centre, multifacility halls for cultural and recreational activities, parks and playgrounds, indoor sports facilities, medical and healthcare facilitated by Narayan Medical College hospital, administrative block.

To manage the day-to-day affairs of the Administration, the administrative block has dedicated Office of The Chancellor, The Vice-Chancellor and all office bearers of the university. A Board Room for Top Management & HODS meeting and decision making. The Building also has centralized Admission Centre, MIS Centre and Design and Media Centre.
