= Tomb of Sher Shah Suri =

Tomb in Sasaram, Bihar, India

Coordinates: 24.9481°N 84.0092°E

Sher Shah Suri Tomb
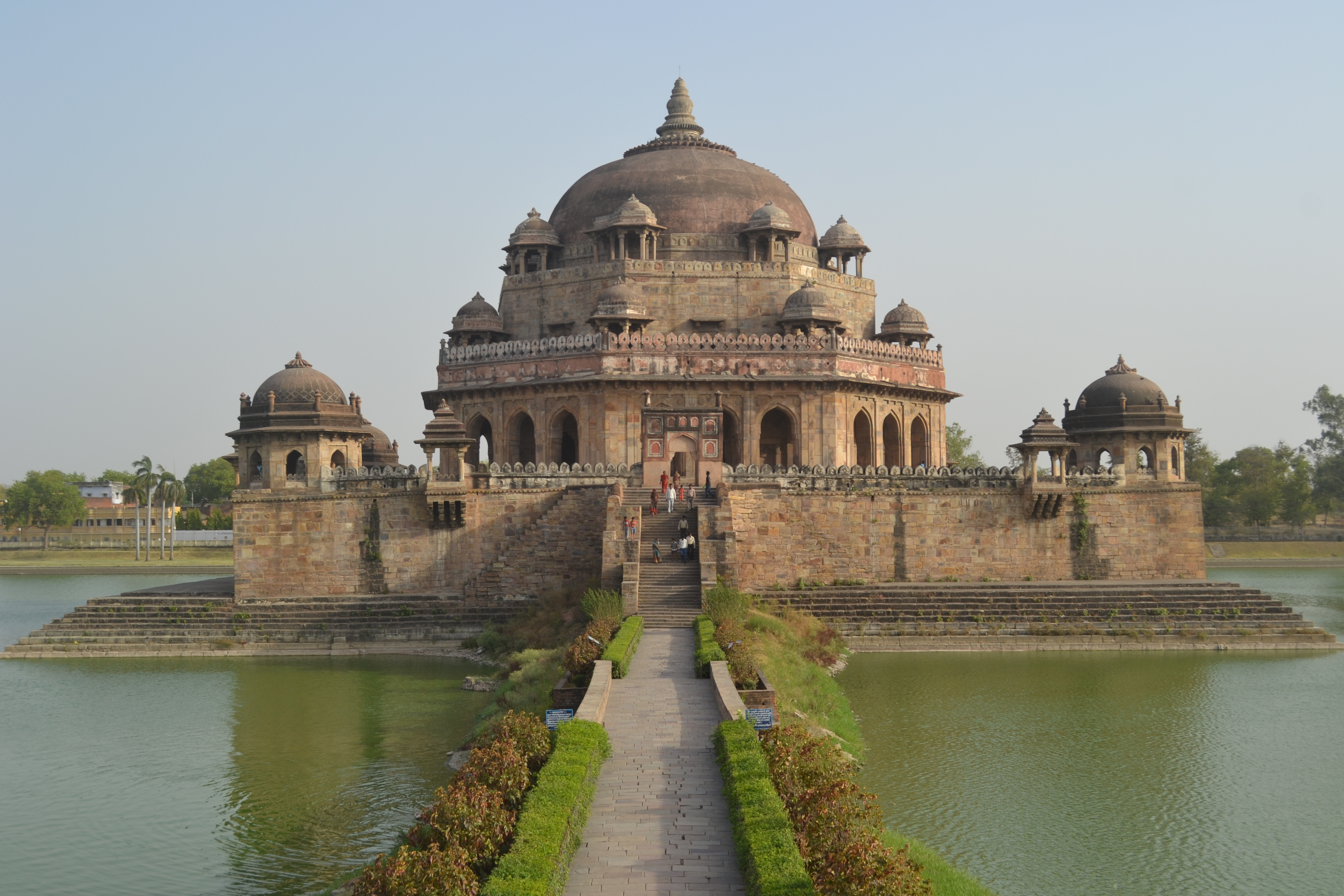
- Sher Shah Suri's Tomb at Sasaram.
- Interactive map of Sher Shah Suri Tomb
- Location: Sasaram, Bihar, India
- Designer: Alawal Khan
- Type: Indo-Islamic architecture
- Material: Sandstone
- Height: 122 ft (37 m)
- Completion date: 16 August 1545
- Dedicated to: Sher Shah Suri
- Location in Bihar

The Tomb of Sher Shah Suri is a mausoleum located in Sasaram, in the Indian state of Bihar. Sher Shah Suri, who was the founder of the Sur Empire, commissioned the tomb for himself. It was completed on 16 August 1545, about three months after his death.

It is situated on a square plinth in the middle of an artificial lake, accessible by a causeway. The tomb, made out of sandstone, was originally painted in bright colours and decorated with glazed tiles. It is a three-storied octagonal building, surmounted by a large dome. Chhatris are located on each edge of the second and third stories. A veranda runs along the circumference of the tomb, with each side having three arched openings.

Arched windows, embellished with latticed screens serve to illuminate the interior. Entrance is from all sides except the western side, which is the qibla wall reserved for prayer. At the center of the western wall is the prayer niche, which is elaborately decorated with carvings and tile work.

The tomb, which was the largest mausoleum in India at the time of its completion, is considered a significant example of Indo-Islamic architecture and one of the most important monuments in Bihar. It is listed as a monument of national importance.

== History ==
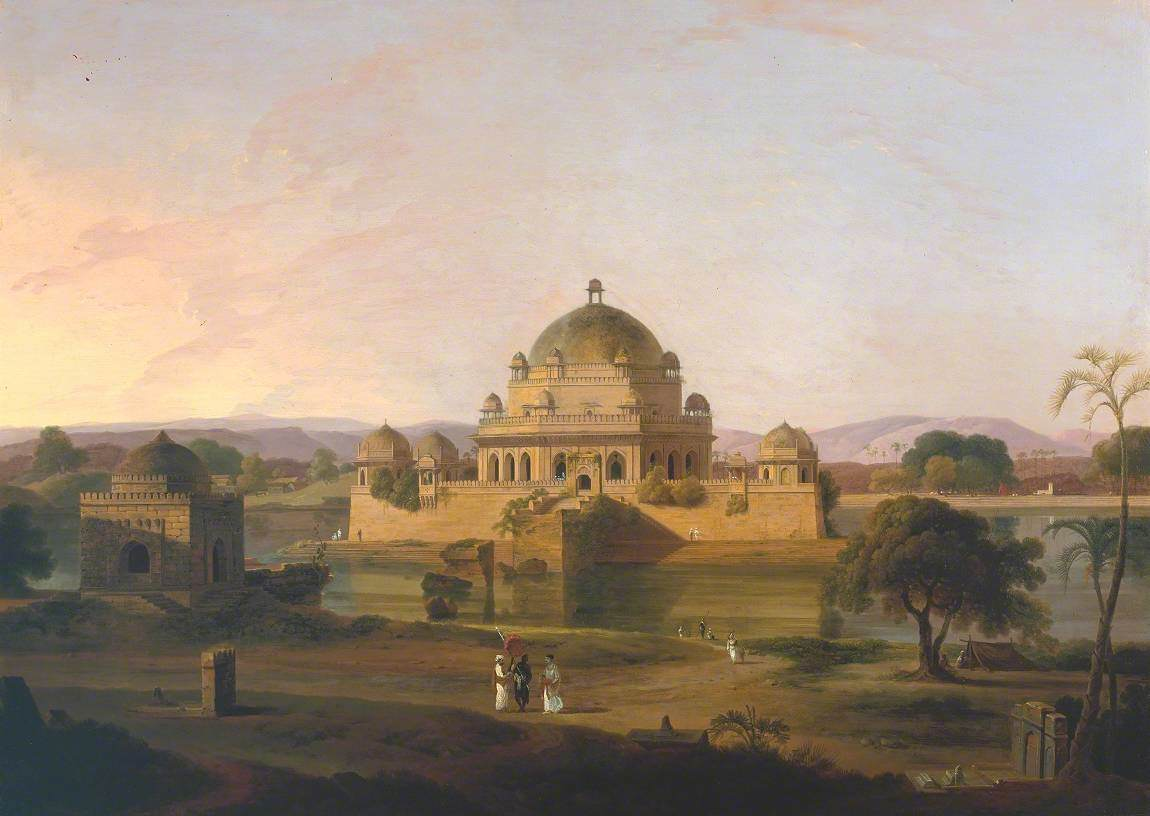
Sher Shah's Mausoleum, Sasaram by Thomas Daniell, 1810.

The tomb was commissioned by Sher Shah during his lifetime, possibly in 1542. Three months before the completion of the tomb, Sher Shah died on 22 May 1545 in an accidental gunpowder explosion outside Kalinjar Fort whose siege he had been leading at the time. Construction continued during the reign of Islam Shah Suri, and the tomb was completed on 16 August 1545. At the time of its completion, it was the largest mausoleum in all of India.

Local tradition identifies Mir Muhammad Aliwal Khan as the architect of the tomb.

In 1778, William Hodges became among the first British landscape painters to visit India. While there, he made careful observations of the art and architecture he encountered. He published an illustrated book about his travels in India in 1794. In his book, he described the Tomb of Sher Shah Suri in detail.

== Architecture ==
The tomb is an example of Indo-Islamic architecture. The octagonal tombs built by the Sayyid and Lodi dynasties at Delhi, such as the Tomb of Sikandar Lodi are considered to be the inspiration for this tomb. The Tomb of Hasan Khan Suri, also commissioned by Sher Shah and completed before this tomb, is considered as a prototype for this tomb.

=== Exterior ===
The tomb stands in the middle of an artificial lake and is locally known as pani roza. Rectangular in shape, the lake originally measured 1,200 feet (370 m) east to west, by 900 feet (270 m) north to south. The lake was meant to represent the pond of abundance, and this symbolism is alluded by the verses of Al-Kawthar inscribed in the tomb interior. It is also thought to have been inspired by the Jal Mandir. Its banks were originally terraced, and landscaped with trees and bushes. In the middle of the north bank is a small domed gatehouse, which is connected to the tomb by a stone causeway. The original causeway was destroyed, and the current structure was constructed in 1914–15 by the Archaeological Survey of India.

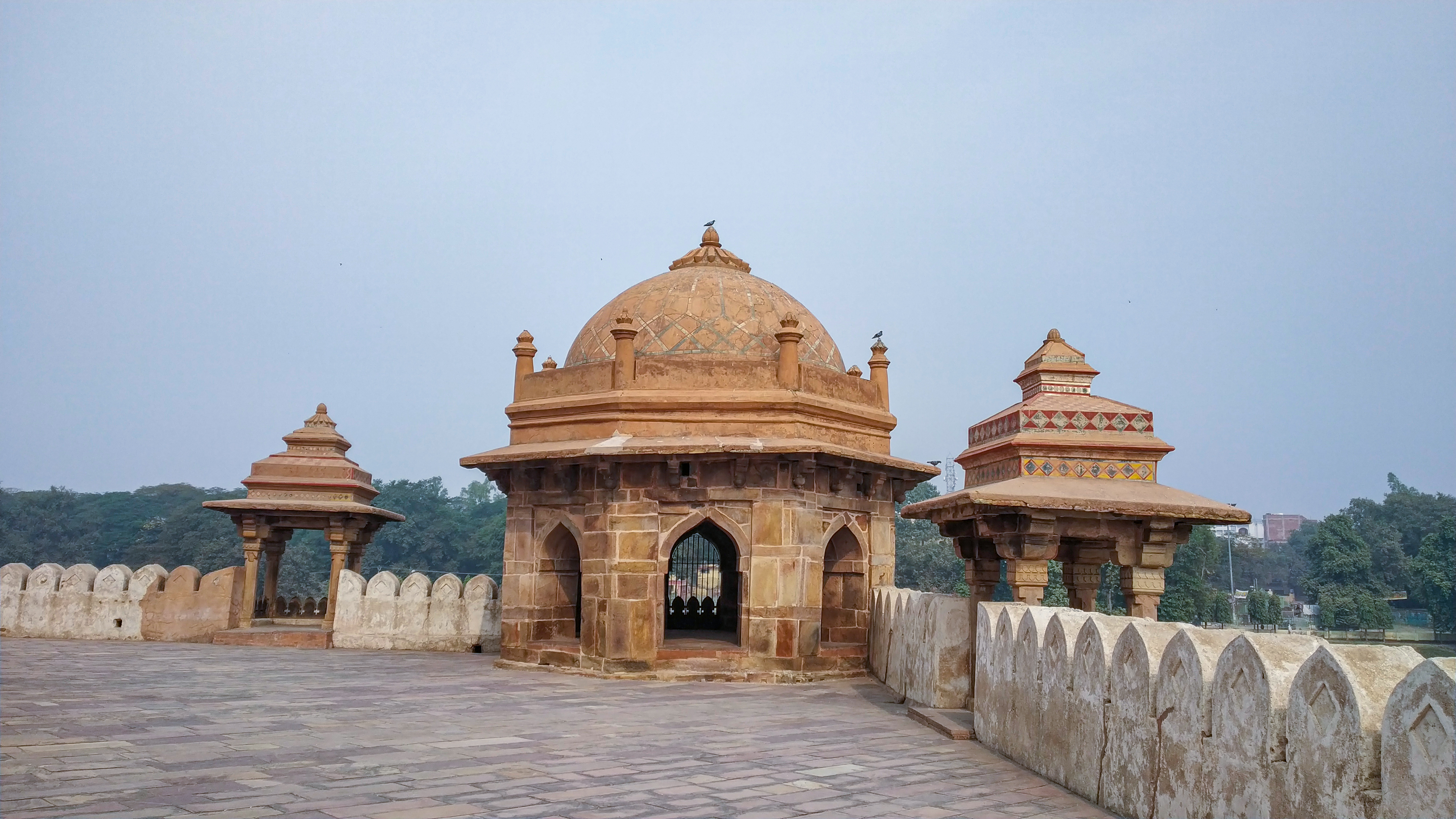
Chhatris located on the plinth

The tomb has a height of 122 feet and is built out of red sandstone. The tomb stands on a square stone plinth, about 22 feet (6.7 m) high. Octagonal domed chhatris are situated on each of its corners; further, there are stone banks and stepped moorings on all sides of the plinth. Smaller, four-pillared chhatris are situated near both ends of the north, south, and east walls. In the middle of each side of the plinth are flights of steps which lead to a platform, upon which is the tomb. A portal is located on all sides except the west, through which the inner part of the platform is accessed.

The main tomb is a three-storied building built on octagonal plan. The first story consists of the outer veranda, encircling the entire length of the building. Each side of the veranda featured three entrance arches. A carved boss representing a lotus is provided in the spandrel of each arch. The inner wall of the veranda is the outer wall of the actual mortuary chamber. Like the outer wall, it follows an octagonal pattern with three arches on each side. Of these, the middle arch forms the actual entrance, while the other two are blind arches; except, on the western side, all three are blind arches. The inner wall is 16 feet (4.9 m) deep, and is embellished by a recessed arch with lotus medallions.

The second story includes a balcony, with a battlement that acts as a parapet. The balcony measures about 16 feet (4.9 m), and its chief feature is the domed chhatris on each corner. The third story is also provided with chhatris on each corner, which are smaller than those of the second. The great dome, whose exterior diameter measures 80 feet (24 m), is crowned by an amalaka. Originally, it was crowned by a chhatri. (Note: In 1882, the chhatri which surmounted the dome, of which only the plinth had survived, was replaced by an amalaka.(Asher 1977, p. 294))

The tomb was originally painted in bright colours and embellished with glazed tiles. The grand dome was painted white, and the domes of the chhatris on the second and third floors were painted to resemble lotuses.

=== Interior ===
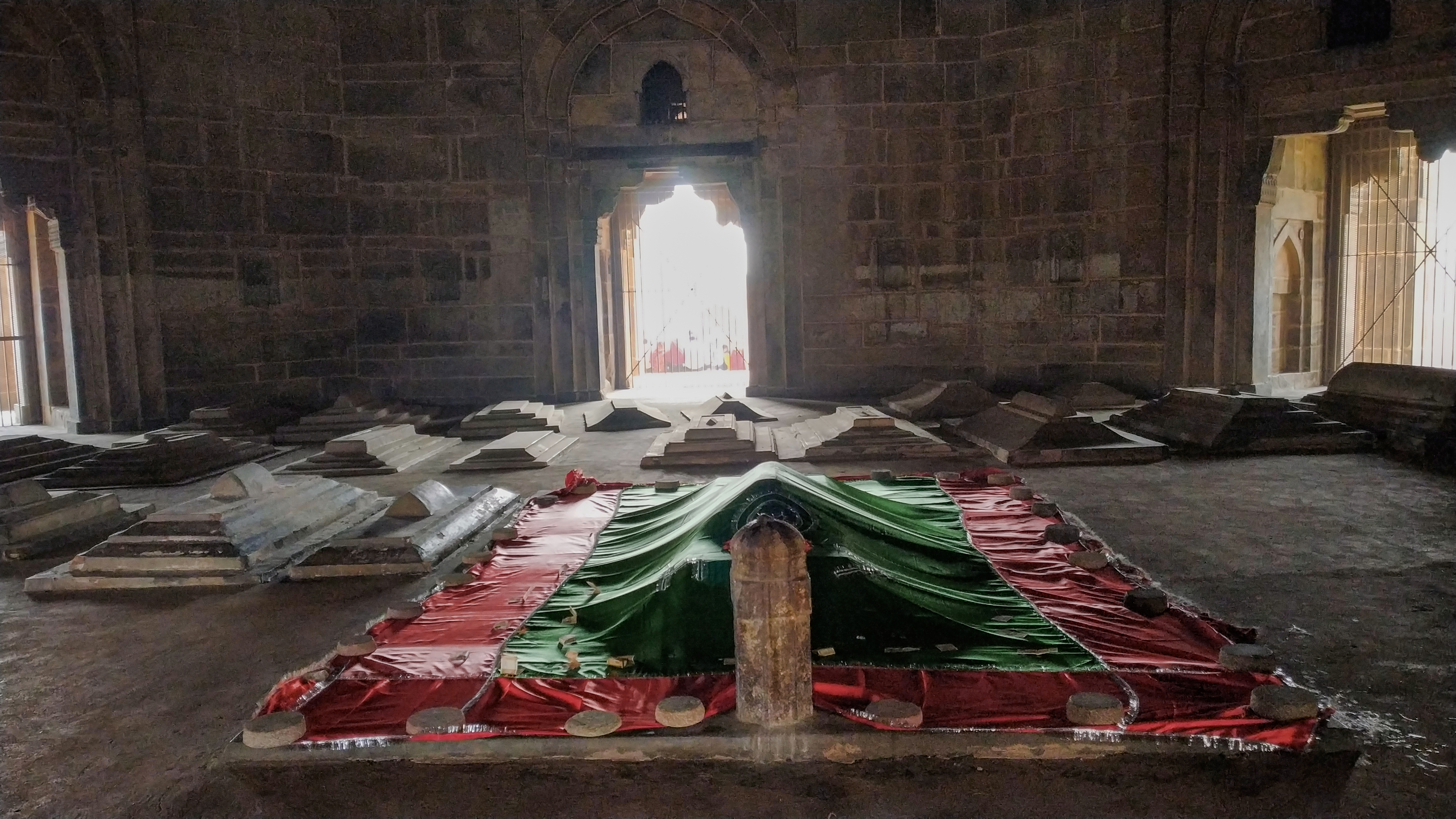
Interior

The interior of the tomb, like the exterior is octagonal in shape. Each side, except the western, contains a door which leads to the verandah. A small, recessed arched niche is located on either side of each door. Above the doors are a series of windows featuring latticed screens, which serve to illuminate the interior. Above the jali windows, the walls have 32 sides, and this 32-sided figure is surmounted by the grand dome, which has an internal diameter of 71 feet.

The western qibla wall contains the mihrab, which is elaborately decorated with carvings and tile work. Most of the carvings consist of verses from the Quran. Three inscriptions are present which glorify the sultan.

== Gallery ==
=== Current ===
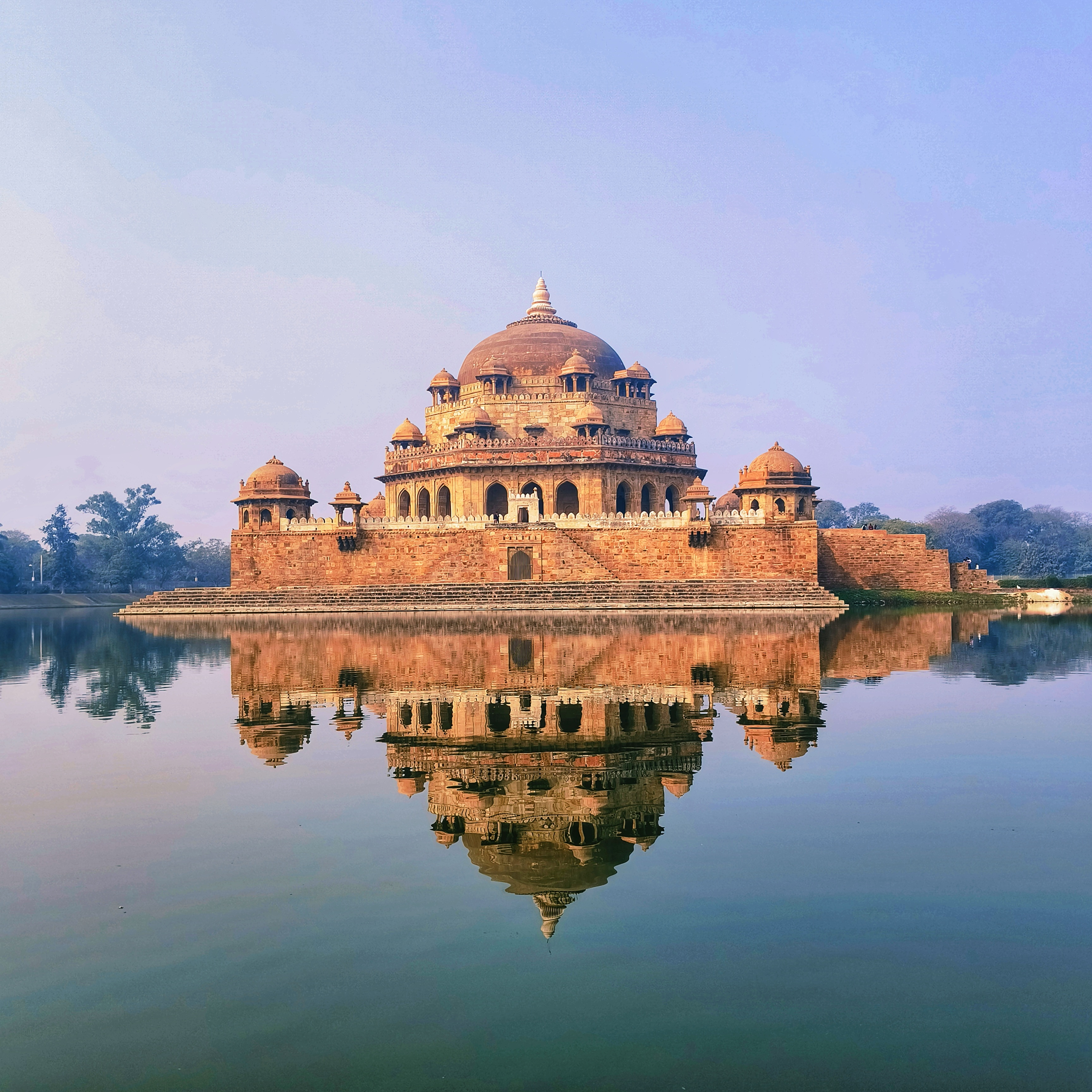

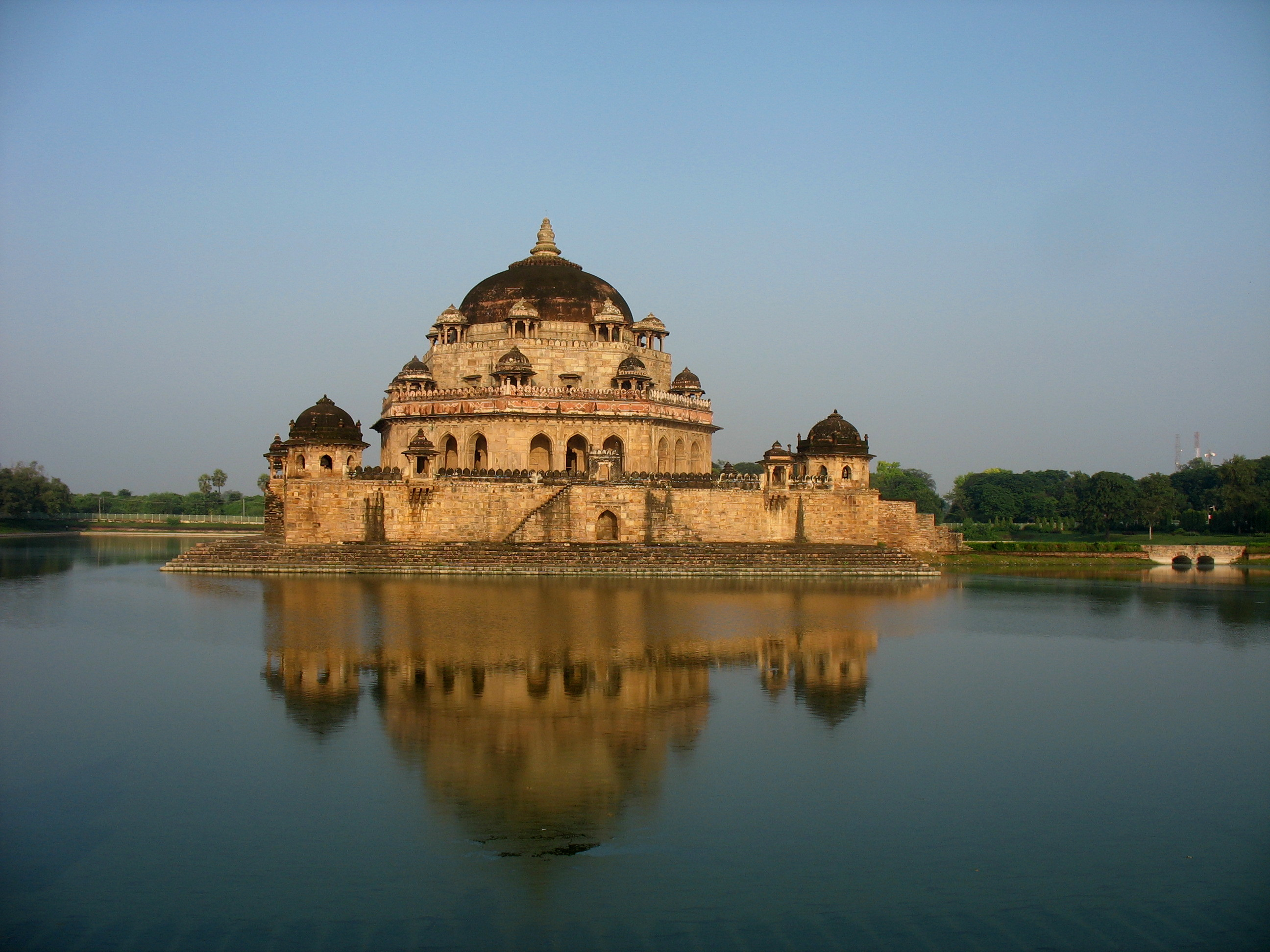

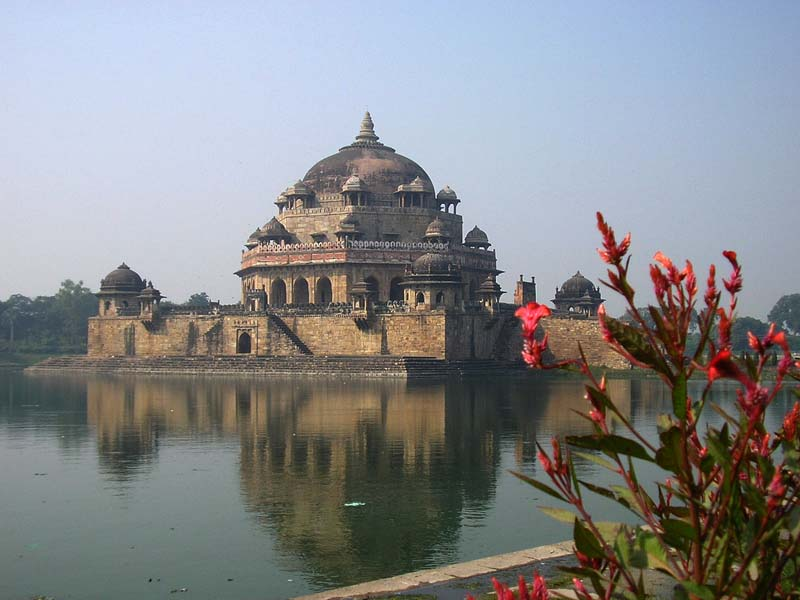

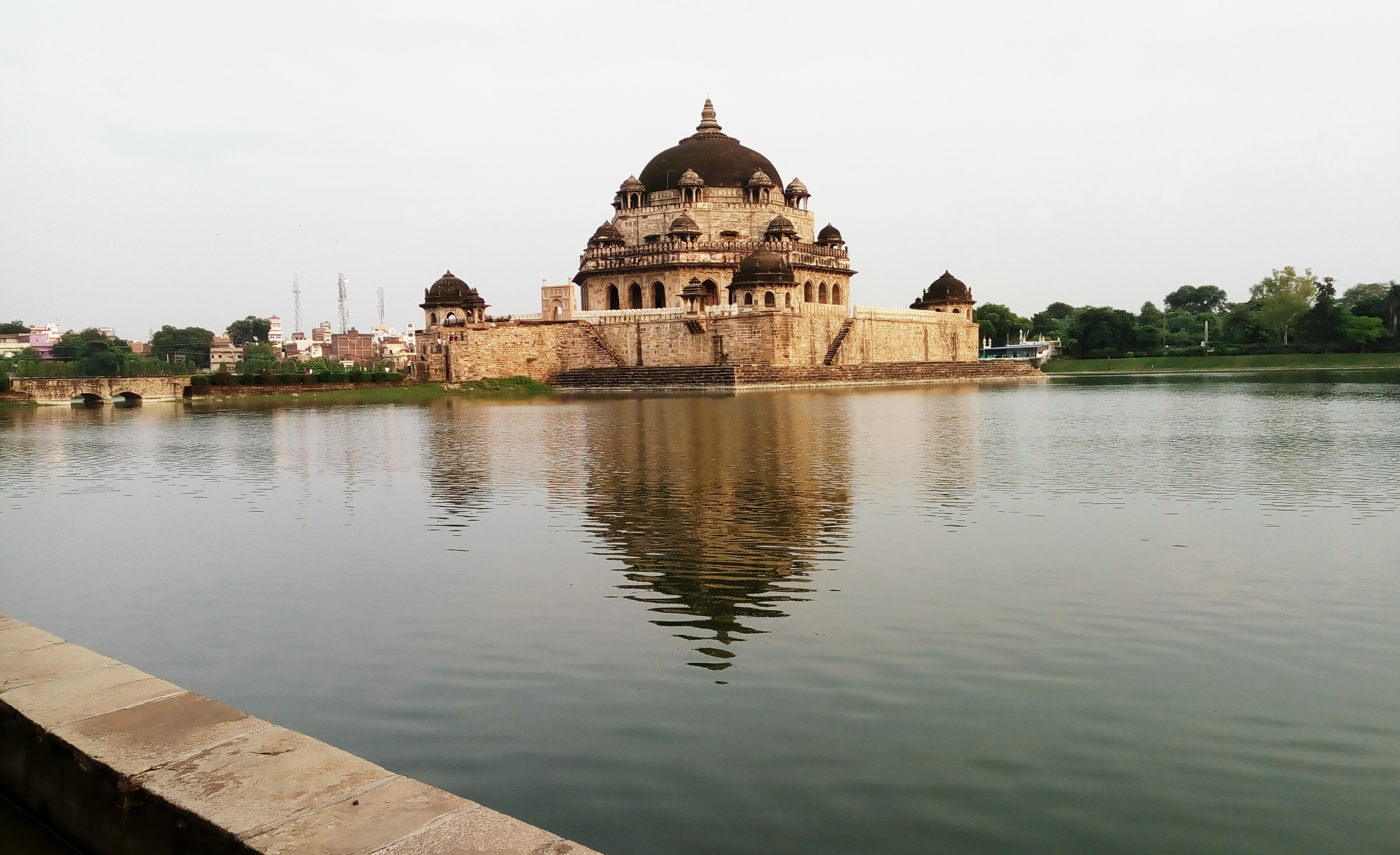

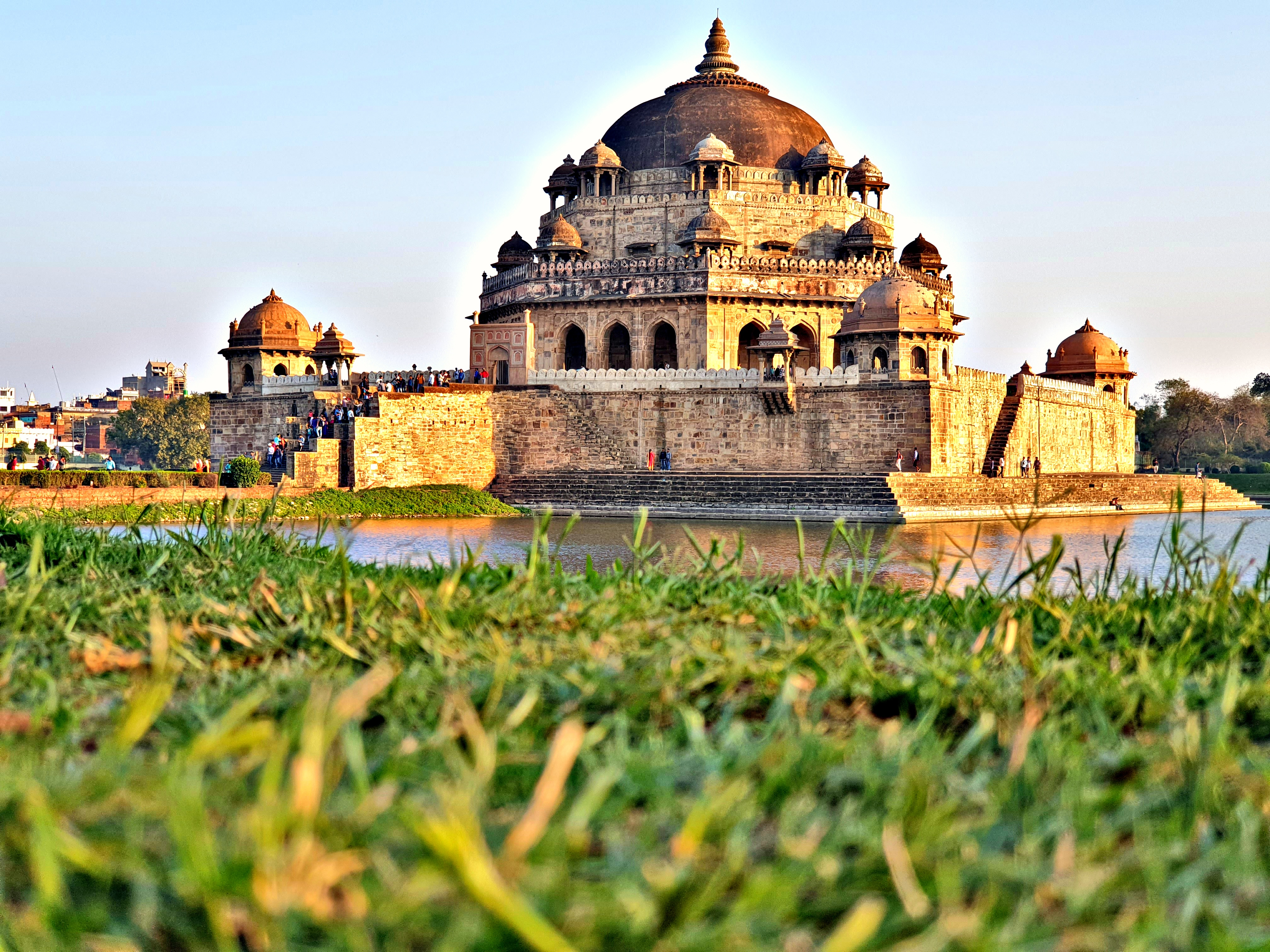

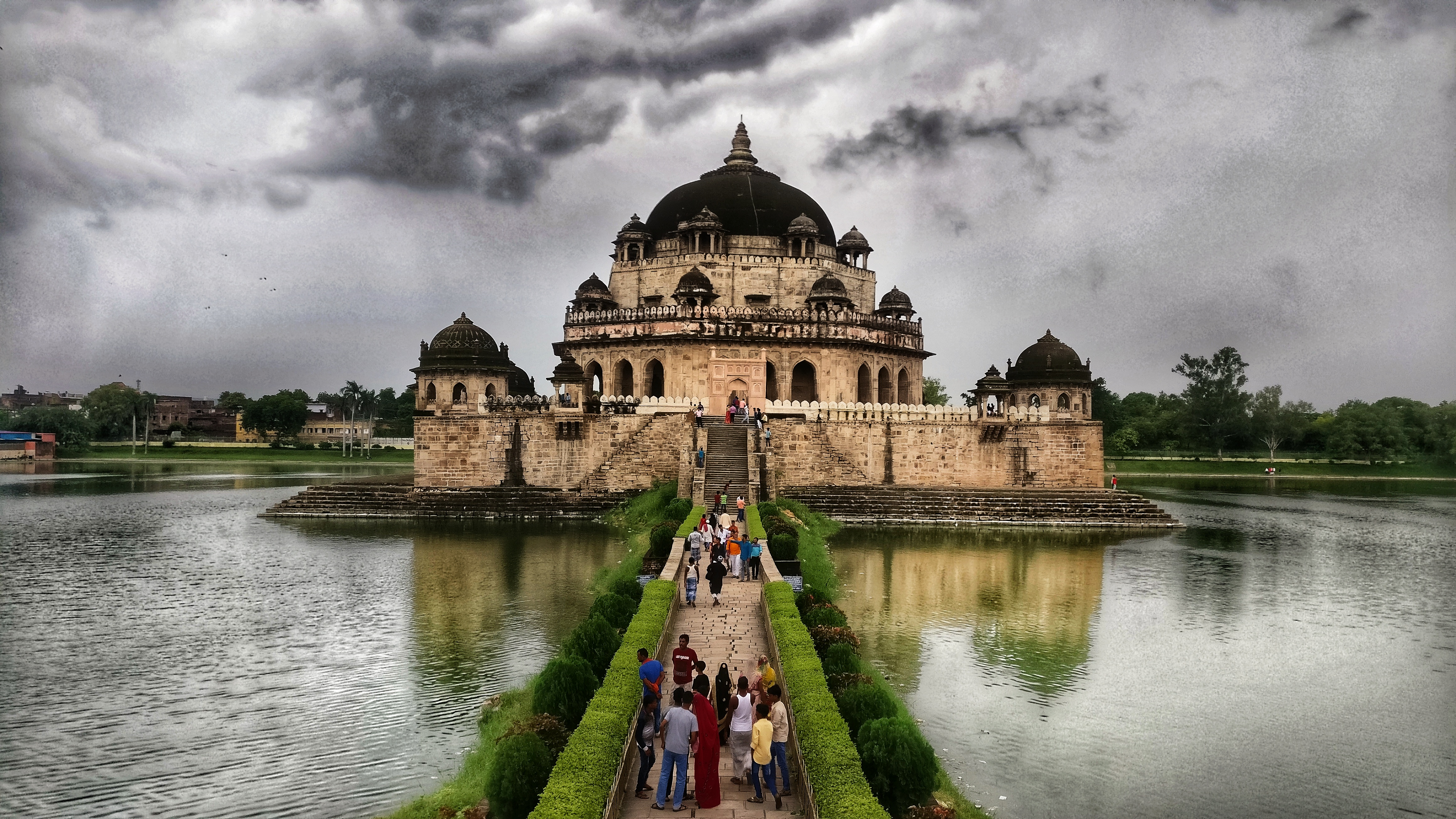

=== Historic ===
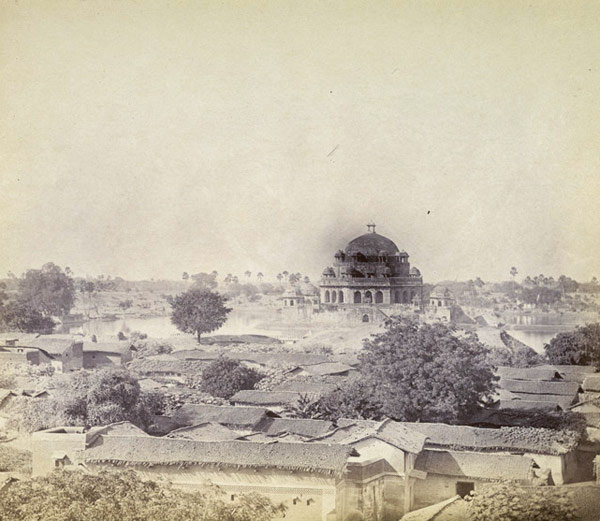

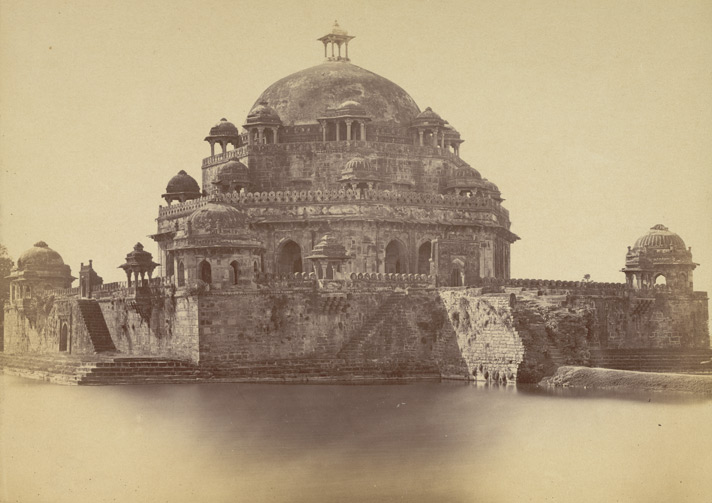

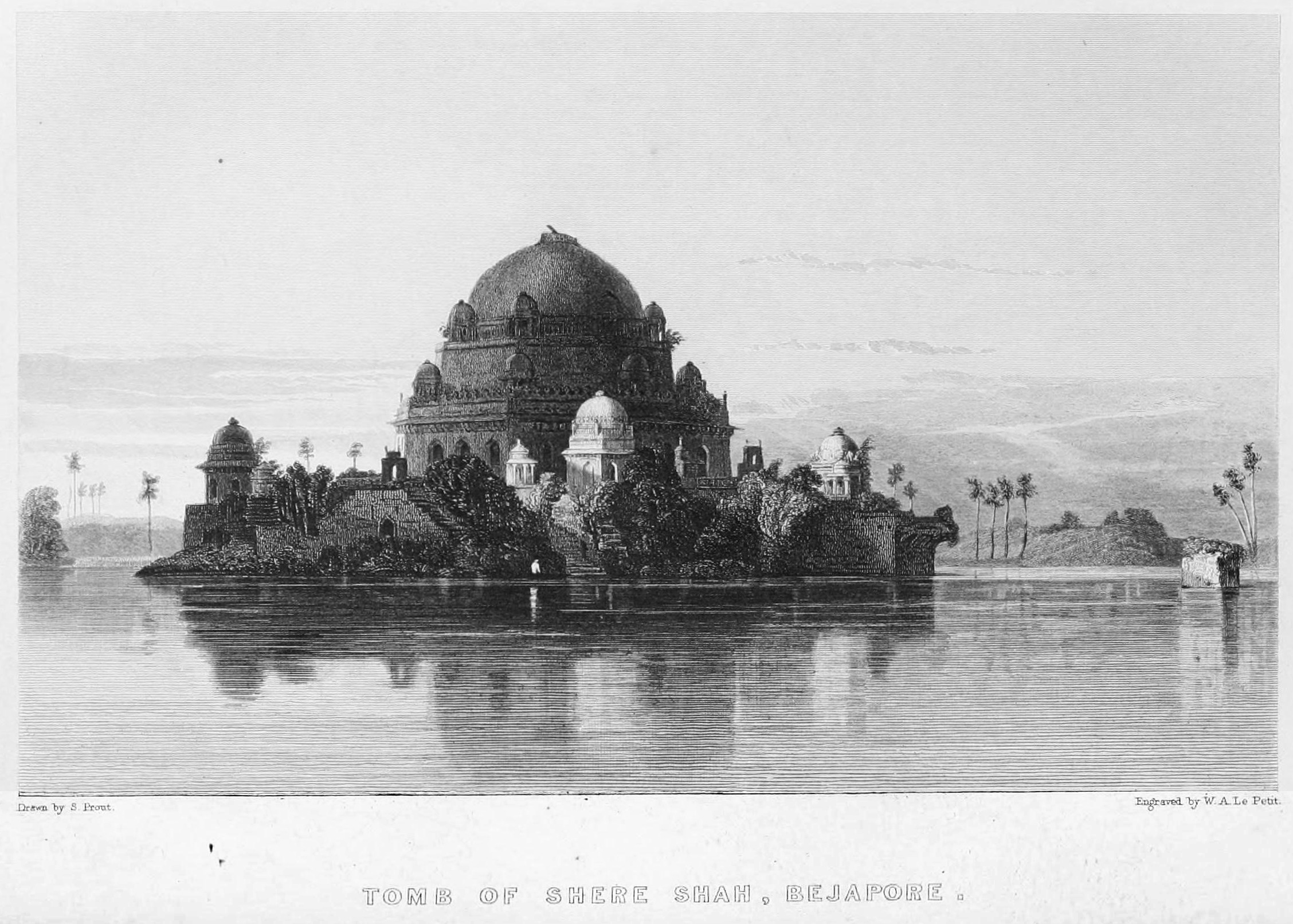

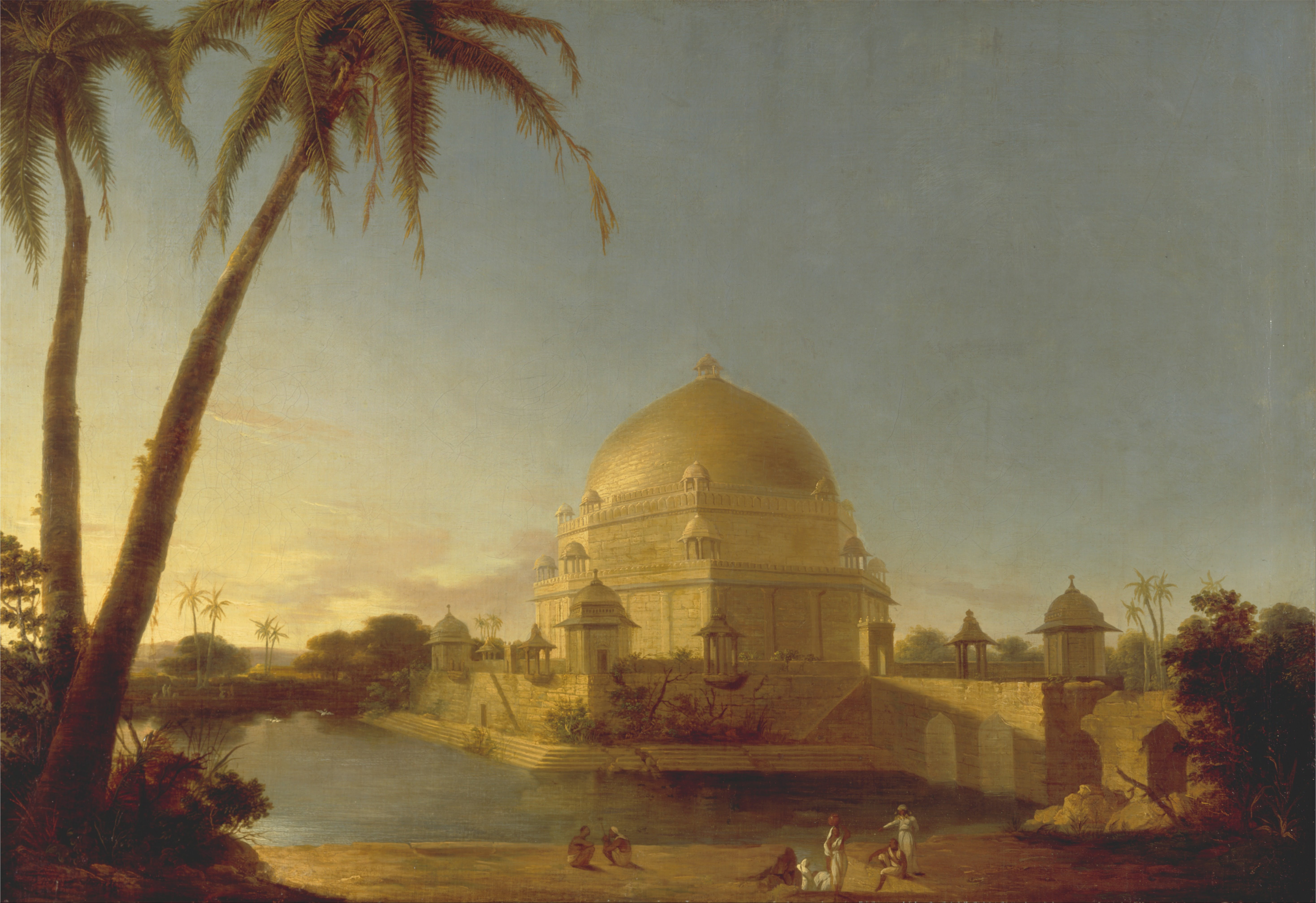

=== Plaque, info, tablet ===
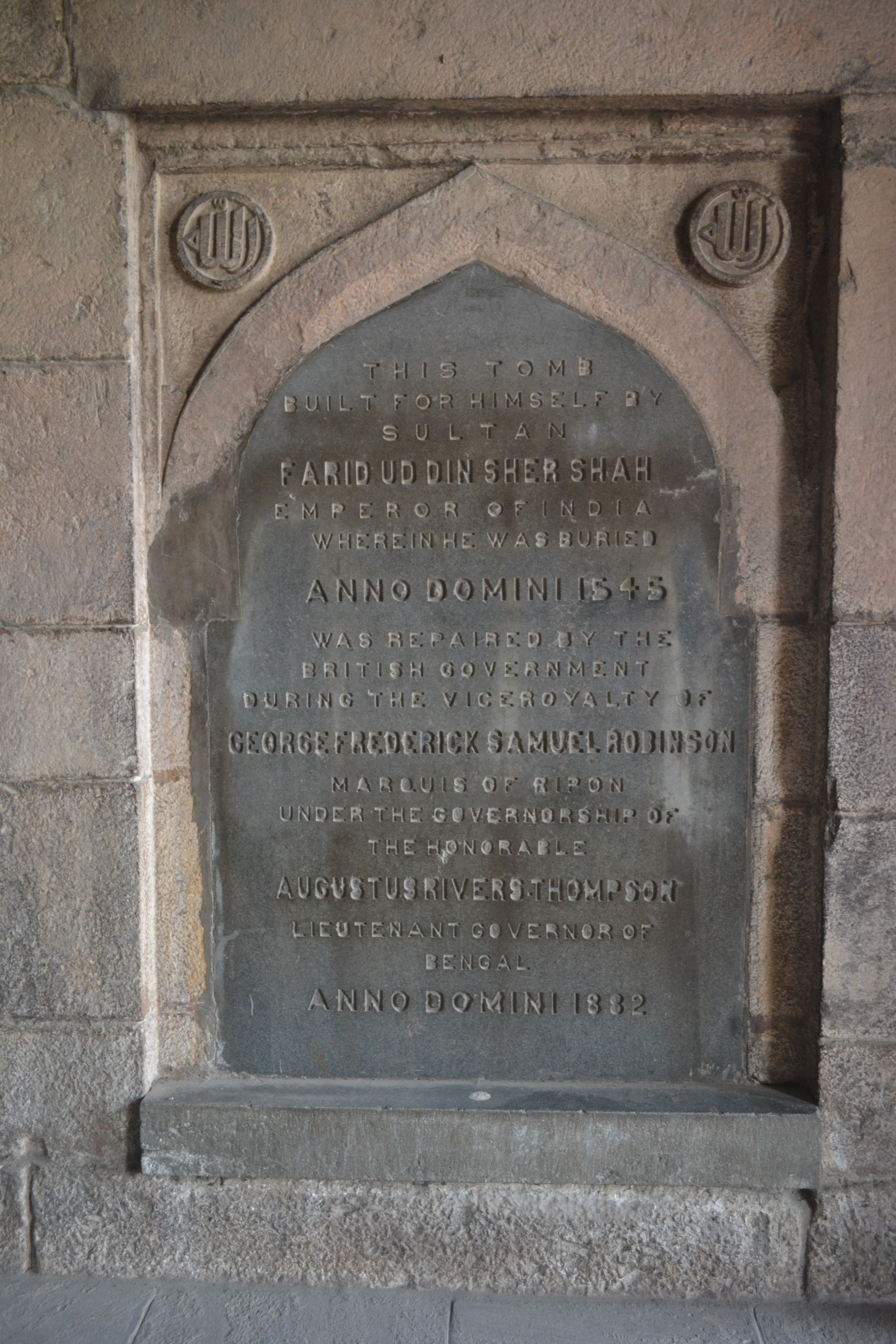
Old Plaque

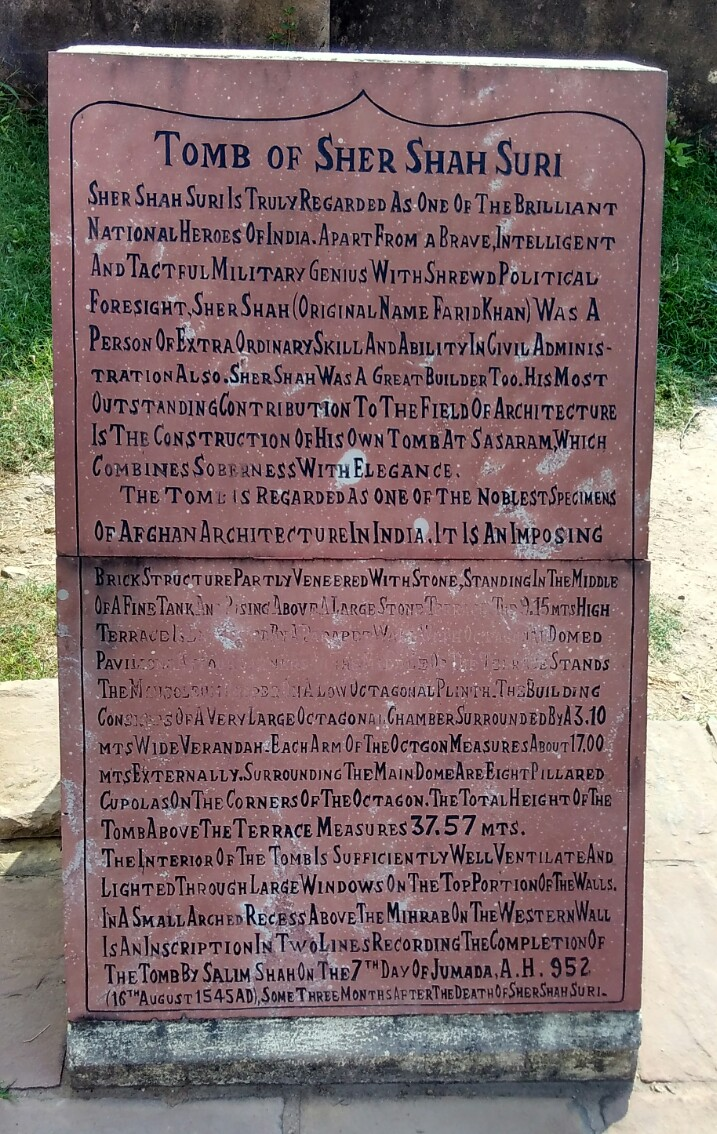
Information Board

== See also ==
- Tomb of Hasan Khan Suri
- Shergarh Fort

== Bibliography ==
- Tomb of Sher Shah by R Chopra, Indo-Iranica Vol. 10 (2)
- Asher, Catherine B. (1977). "The mausoleum of Sher Shah Suri". Artibus Asiae. 39 (3/4). Artibus Asiae Publishers: 273–298. doi:10.2307/3250169. JSTOR 3250169.
