= Shergarh Fort =

Ruined fort in India

- Location in Sasaram, Rohtas, Bihar, India
- 24°49′40″N 83°43′41″E
- Location: Sasaram, India

History
- Built: 1540-45

Site notes
- Architectural style: Indo-Islamic
- Owner: Sur Empire (1540–1545)

Shergarh Fort (also known as Qila Shergarh, Bhurkuda Fort) is a ruined fort in Malhipur, Chenari block of Sasaram, it is well connected from Kudra and as well from Sasaram, Bihar. It is a hill fort on a Kaimur plateau about 800 feet in height and was fortified by Emperor Sher Shah Suri. The fort is in dense forest, making access difficult from the bottom of the plateau. The fort lies on the banks of the Durgavati River.

== History ==
The fort was built between 1540 and 1545 by Emperor Sher Shah Suri. In the 16th century the fort was known as Bhurkuda Qila.

== Architecture ==
The area of the fort is nearly 16 km^{2}. Its main entrance originally had eight small domes but now there are only five. One kilometre from the main entrance is a lake called "Rani Pokhra" (lit. 'Queen's Pond'), and on an adjacent hill is an underground fort.

== See also ==
- Tomb of Sher Shah Suri
- Unique Things to do in Dholpur - Shergarh Fo rt
