= Banjari, Bihar =

Banjari
- Town
- Location in Bihar, India
- Coordinates: 24.6667°N 83.9833°E
- Country: India
- State: Bihar
- District: Rohtas

Languages
  - Local: Hindi, Bhojpuri
- Time zone: UTC+5:30 (IST)
- PIN: 821303
- Nearest City: Dehri On Sone
- Website: rohtas.nic.in

Banjari is a small town at the south-western tip of Bihar state, India. It is located on the Sone River, the largest of the Ganges' southern tributaries, in Rohtas district. It is framed by the Kaimur mountain range, to the south-east of Sasaram.

Banjari has a diverse climate, subtropical in general, with hot summers and cool winters.

The nearest market is Akbarpur market, at a distance of 3 km.

== Dalmia DSP Cement Limited (DDSPL, Kalyanpur) ==
One of the largest cement manufacturing facilities of the state, Kalyanpur Cements Ltd., located in Banjari, is a leading cement manufacturer of eastern India. It runs the only integrated cement manufacturing facility in Bihar and markets its cement in Bihar, Jharkhand and Uttar Pradesh.

Kalyanpur, which was established in 1937, marketed its cement under the popular KC Super, KC Special and Castcrete brands.

In the year 2018, Dalmia Cement Bharat Limited acquired Kalyanpur Cement Limited (KCL) and is currently operating the plant under the brand name of Dalmia DSP Limited.

== Transportation ==
The Dehri-On-Sone railway station is the nearest railway station which is located 36 km from the Dalmia DSP Ltd plant.

Gaya International Airport is the nearest airport located 139 km from Kalyanpur. Lal Bahadur Shastri International Airport is the major airport nearby for international and domestic flights, located 178 km from Kalyanpur.
