= Sasaram =

- City
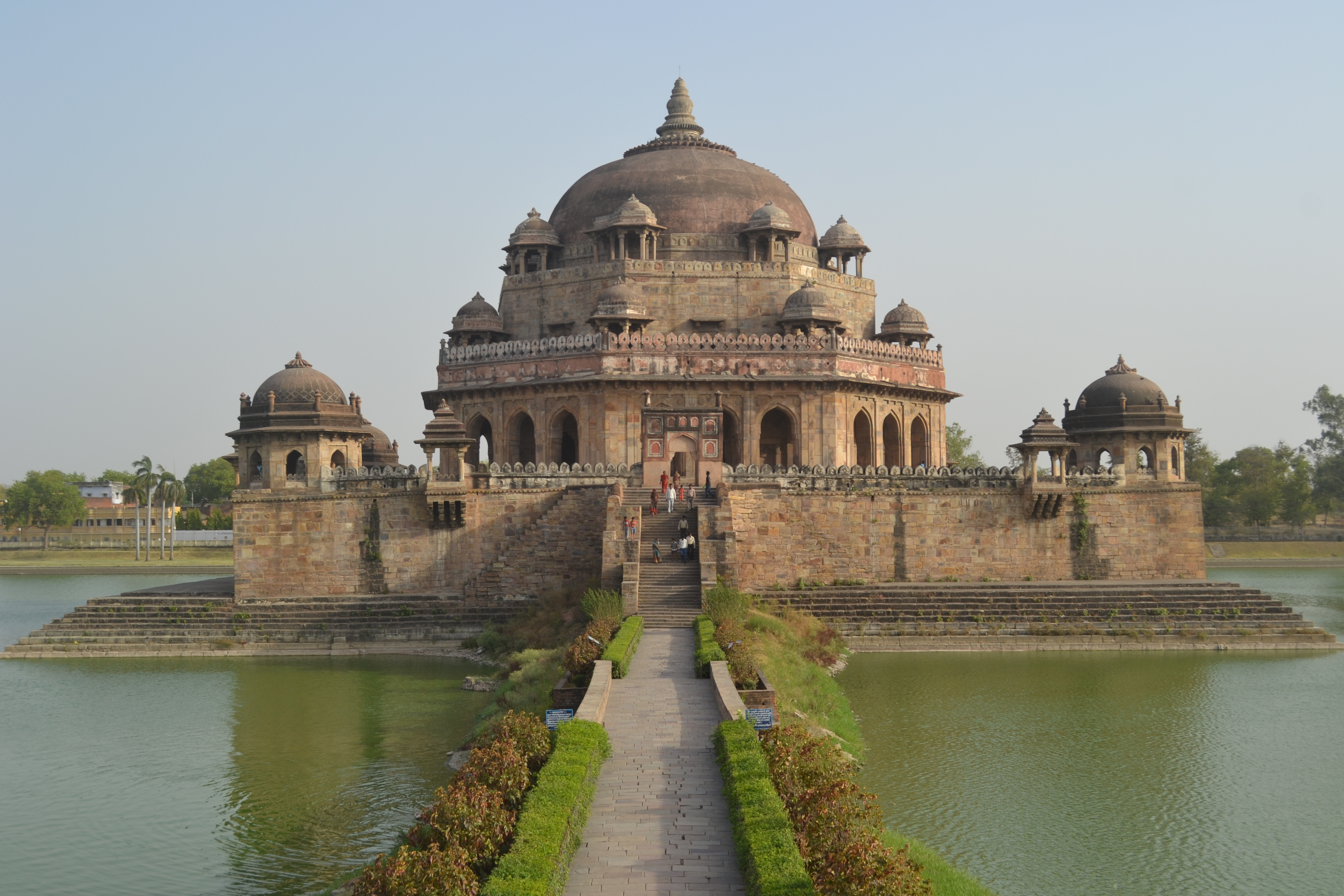
- Tomb of Sher Shah Suri, Sasaram

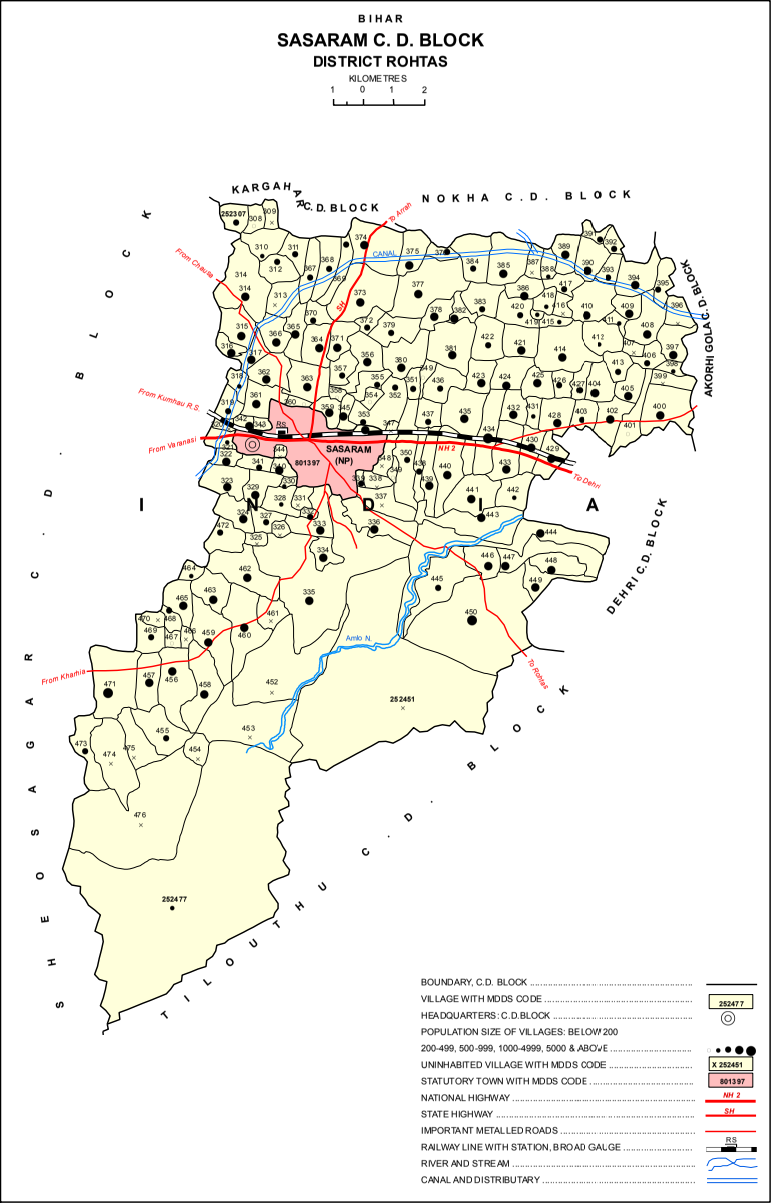
- Location in Sasaram block

- Location in Bihar, India Sasaram (India)
- Coordinates: 24.95°N 84.03°E
- Country: India
- State: Bihar
- Division: Patna
- District: Rohtas

Government
  - Type: Municipal Corporation
  - Body: Sasaram Municipal Corporation
  - Member of Parliament: Manoj Kumar (Indian National Congress)
  - Mayor: Kajal Kumari
  - Vice-Mayor: Satyavati Devi
  - District Magistrate: Deepak Kumar Mishra, IAS
  - Superintendent of Police: Raj, IPS

Area
  - Total: 151.71 km^{2} (58.58 sq mi)
- Elevation: 108 m (354 ft)

Population (2011)
  - Total: 270,879
  - Density: 1,785.5/km^{2} (4,624.4/sq mi)
- Demonym: Sasaramite

Language
  - Official: Hindi
  - Additional official: Urdu
  - Regional: Bhojpuri
- Time zone: UTC+5:30
- PIN: 821115
- Telephone code: 06184
- ISO 3166 code: IN-BR
- Vehicle registration: BR-24
- Wards: 48
- Railway Station: Sasaram Junction
- Website: www.sasaramnagarnigam.com

Sasaram, also spelled as Shahasaram and Sasseram, is a historical city and a municipal corporation region in the Rohtas district of Bihar state in eastern India.

The city served as the capital of the Sur dynasty during Sher Shah Suri's rule over India in the 16th century, and was residence place sub capital of epic monarch Sahasrabahu (Kartivirya Arjuna).

Sasaram and the Kaimur Range contain waterfalls, lakes, rivers and picturesque locations as described by the Ain-I-Akbari. Over 200 waterfalls emerge during the rainy season.

Modern Sasaram city covers the largest sub-metropolitan area of Bihar. Its attractions to visit include the Tomb of Sher Shah Suri (included in UNESCO World Heritage Centre – Tentative list), Tomb of Hasan Khan Suri, Rohtasgarh Fort, Shergarh Fort, Manjhar Kund, Kashish waterfall, Karmchat Dam, Salim khan makbara, Tutla Bhawani Mandir, Narayni Devi Mandir, and Dhua Kund.

Sasaram city is located in the middle of its other sub-towns like Nokha and Kudra, which have a large number of agriculture-based industries, and the city is also emerging as an educational hub. It is situated in the middle of other industrial twin towns like Dehri-on-sone, Dalmianagar, Sonnagar, Amjhor, Nokha, and Banjari.

The Sasaram city region is the administrative headquarters of Rohtas district. It was carved out from Shahabad district in 1972. This district headquarters is best known for having the highest literacy rate and highest agricultural and forest cover area of Bihar. Sasaram is also the headquarters of a community development block of the same name, with a total population of 358,283 as of 2011, making it the most populous block in Rohtas district.

Major languages spoken in this region are Bhojpuri, Hindi, English, and Urdu; religions of the population include Hinduism, Islam, Buddhism, Christianity, Sikhism, and Jainism.

== History ==
During the Vedic age, Sasaram was a part of the ancient Kashi kingdom. Sasaram's name derives from Sahasrarama, meaning "one thousand groves". Sasaram was once also named Shah Sarai (meaning "Place of the King"), as it is the birthplace of the Afghan king Sher Shah Suri, who ruled over Delhi, much of northern India, present-day Pakistan, and eastern Afghanistan for five years as the Sur Empire, after defeating the Mughal Emperor, Humayun. Many of Sher Shah Suri's governmental practices were adopted by the Mughals and later the British Raj, including taxation, administration, and the building of a paved road from Kabul to Bengal, also called the Grand Trunk Road.

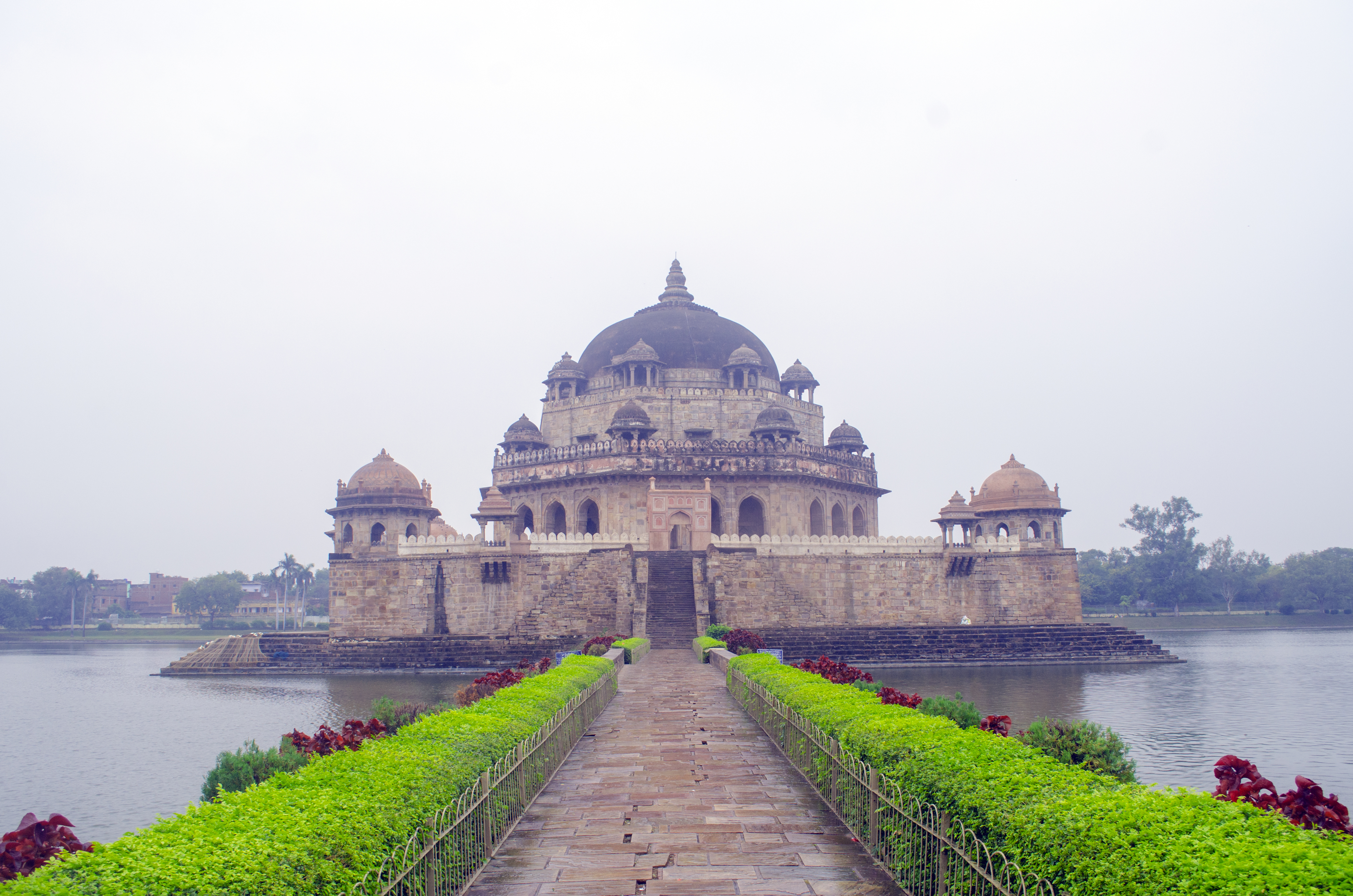
Mausoleum of Sher Shah

Sher Shah Suri's 122-foot (37 m) red sandstone tomb, built in the Indo-Afghan style, stands in the middle of an artificial lake in Sasaram. It borrows heavily from the Lodhi style and was once covered in blue and yellow glazed tiles, indicating an Iranian influence. The massive free-standing dome also has an aesthetic aspect of the Buddhist stupa style of the Mauryan period.

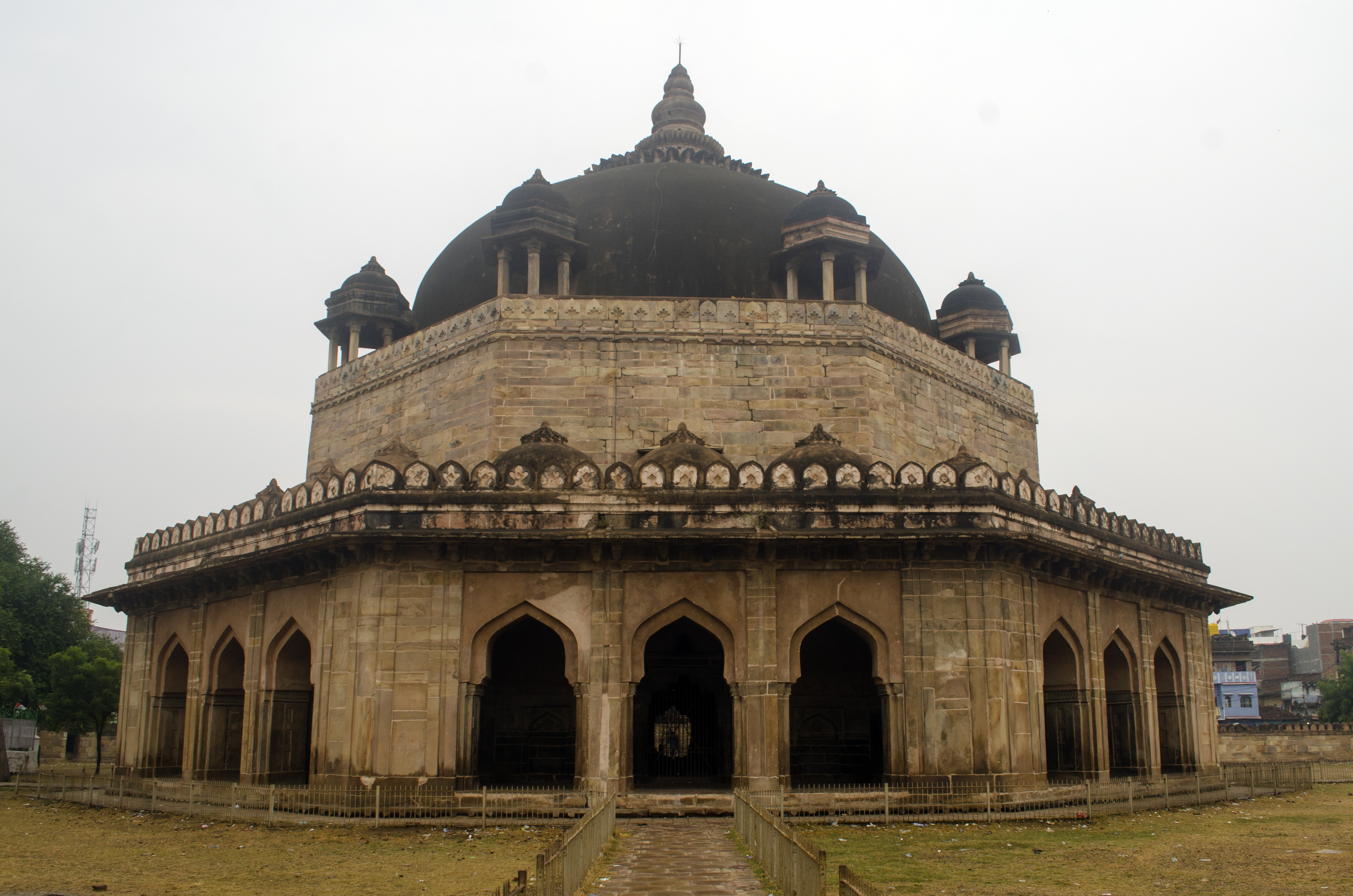
Tomb of Hasan Khan Suri

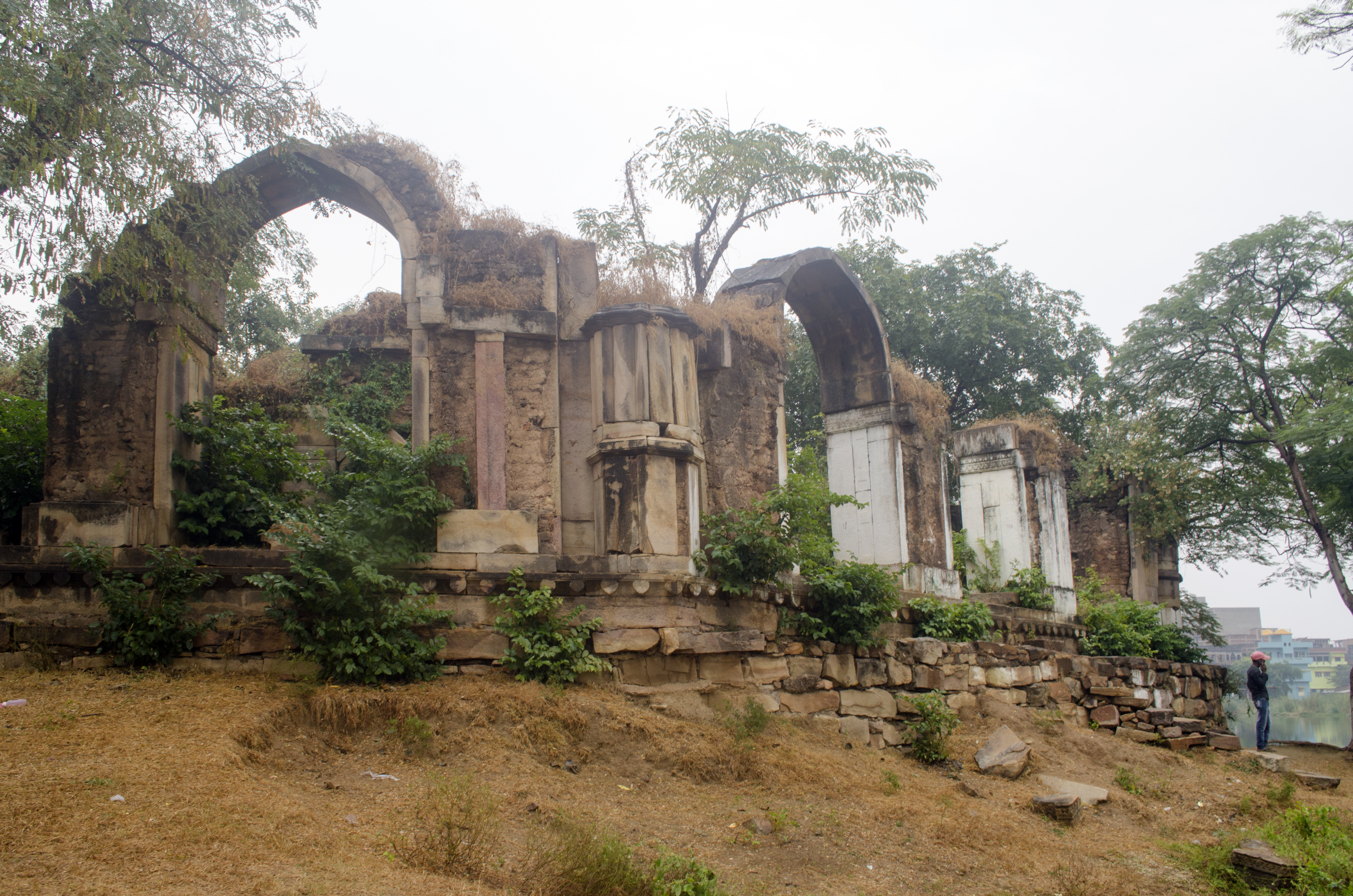
Tomb of Islam Shah Suri

The tomb of Hasan Khan Suri, Sher Shah's father, is also at Sasaram and stands in the middle of a green field at Sherganj, which is known as Sukha Rauza. About a kilometre to the north west of Sher Shah's tomb lies the incomplete and dilapidated tomb of his son and successor, Islam Shah Suri. Sasaram also has a Baulia (a pool used by the emperor's consorts for bathing).

The Rohtas Fort (Rohtasgarh) of Sher Shah Suri is near Sasaram: this fort has a history dating back to the 7th century CE. It was built by Raja Harishchandra and named for his son, Rohitashwa. It houses the Churasan temple, Ganesh temple, Diwan-i-Khas, Diwan-e-Aam, and various other structures dating back to different centuries. The fort also served as the headquarters of Raja Man Singh during his reign as the governor of Bihar and Bengal under the regime of Akbar. The Rohtas Fort in Sasaram was also built by Sher Shah Suri, during the period when Humayun was exiled from Hindustan. The Rohtas Fort near Sasaram in Bihar should not be confused with the Rohtas Fort near Jhelum, Punjab, in present-day Pakistan.

There is a temple of Goddess Tarachandi, two miles to the south, and an inscription of Pratap Dhawal on the rock close to the temple of Chandi Devi. Hindus in large number assemble to worship the goddess. Dhua Kund, a notable waterfall, is located about 15 km (9.3 mi) from the city.

Rohtas, south of Sasaram, is known to have been the residence of one Satyawadi Raja Harischandra, named for his son, Rohitashwa.

=== Minor Rock Edict of Ashoka ===
Sasaram is also famous for an inscription by Ashoka (one of the thirteen Minor Rock Edicts), situated in a small cave of Kaimur hill, near Chandan Shaheed.

The edict is located near the top of the terminal spur of the Kimur Range near Sasaram. There is the Minor rock edict #1 only. Ashoka famously mentions pre-existing stone pillars in the Edict: "...And where there are stone pillars here in my dominion, there also cause it to be engraved.".

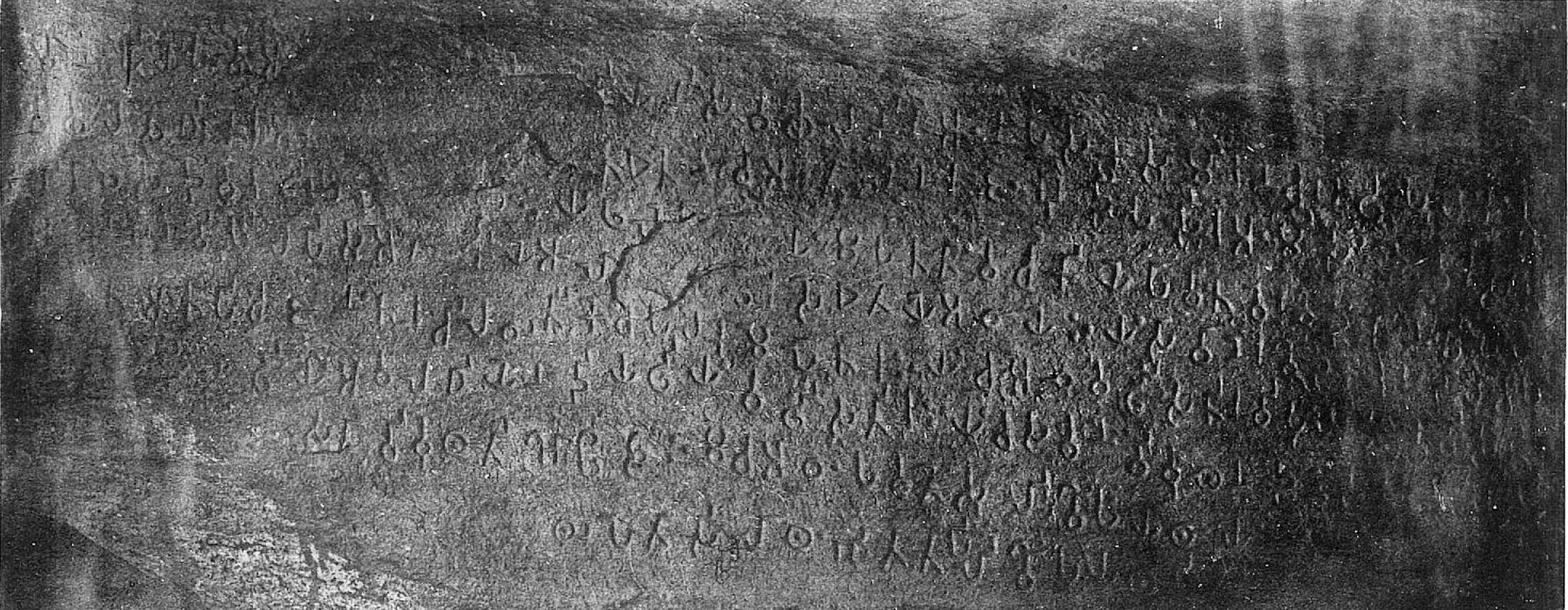
The Sasaram Edict (Minor Rock Edict No.1 only).

1. Devanampriya [speaks] thus.
2. .................. years since I am a lay-worshipper (upasaka).
3. But (I had) not been very zealous.
4. A year and somewhat more (has passed) since ............
5. And men in Jambudvipa, being during that time unmingled with the gods, have (now) been made (by me) mingled with the gods.
6. [For] this is the fruit [of zeal].
7. ...........cannot be reached by (persons of) high rank alone, (but) even a lowly (person) is able to attain even the great heaven if he is zealous.
8. Now, for the following purpose (has) this proclamation (been issued), (that) both the lowly and the exalted may be zealous, and (that) even (my) borderers may know (it), and (that this) zeal may be of long duration,
9. And this matter will (be made by me to) progress, and will (be made to) progress even considerably; it will (be made to) progress to one and a half, to at least one and a half.
10. And this proclamation (was issued by me) on tour.
11. Two hundred and fifty-six nights (had then been) spent on tour, — (in figures) 256.
12. And cause ye this matter to be engraved on rocks.
13. And where there are stone pillars here (in my dominions), there also cause (it) to be engraved.

— Sasaram Edict (Translated in Inscriptions of Asoka. New Edition by E. Hultzsch)

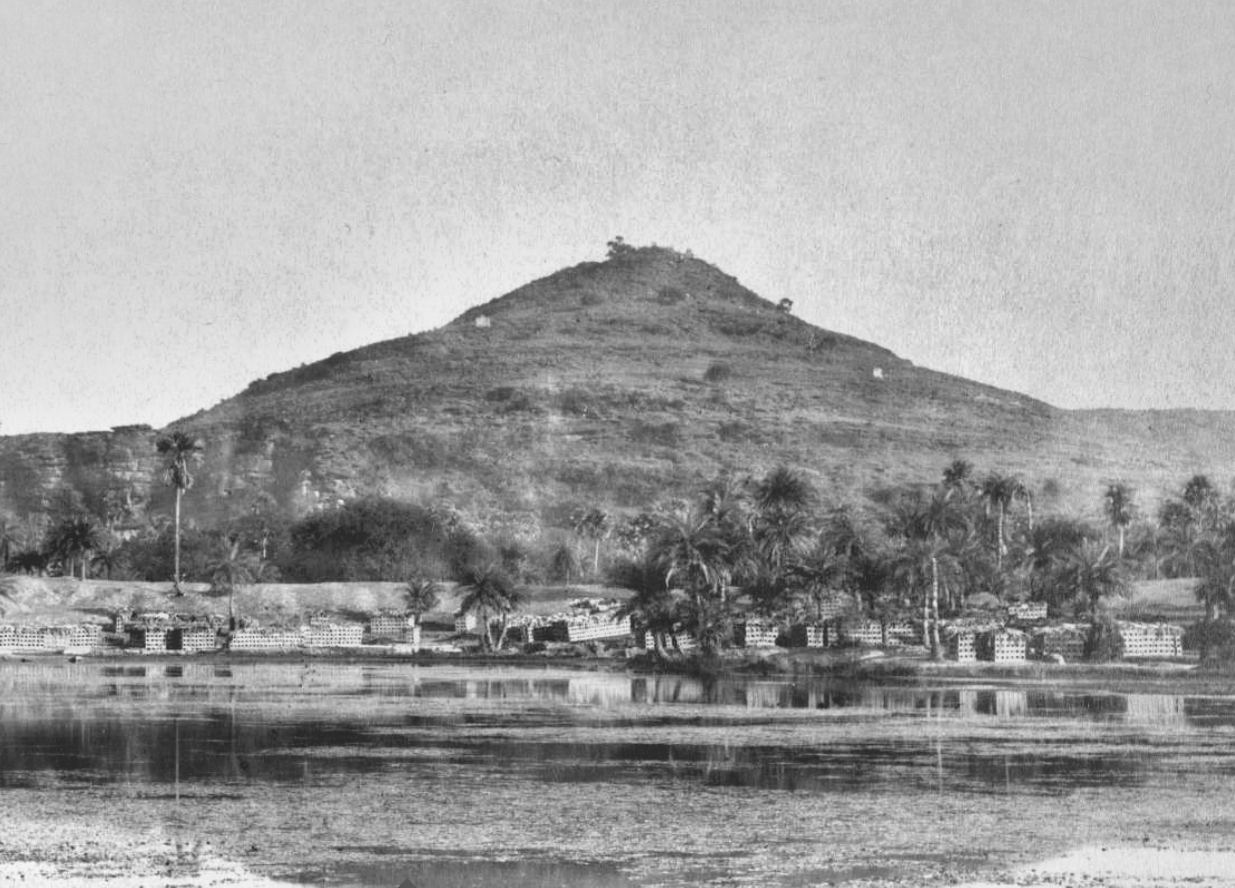
The Edict is located on top of the terminal spur of the Kimur range.

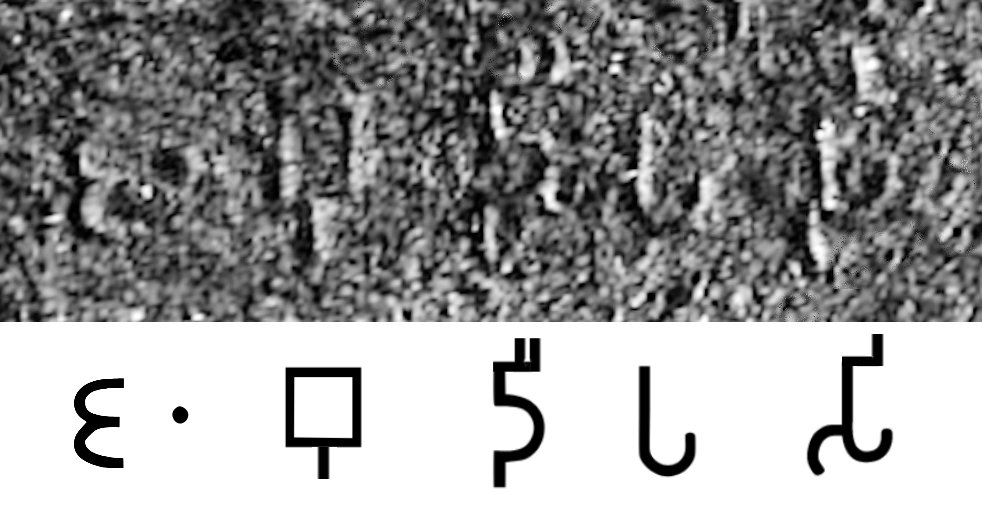
The name Jambudīpasi for "India" (Brahmi script) in the Sahasram Minor Rock Edict of Ashoka, circa 250 BCE.

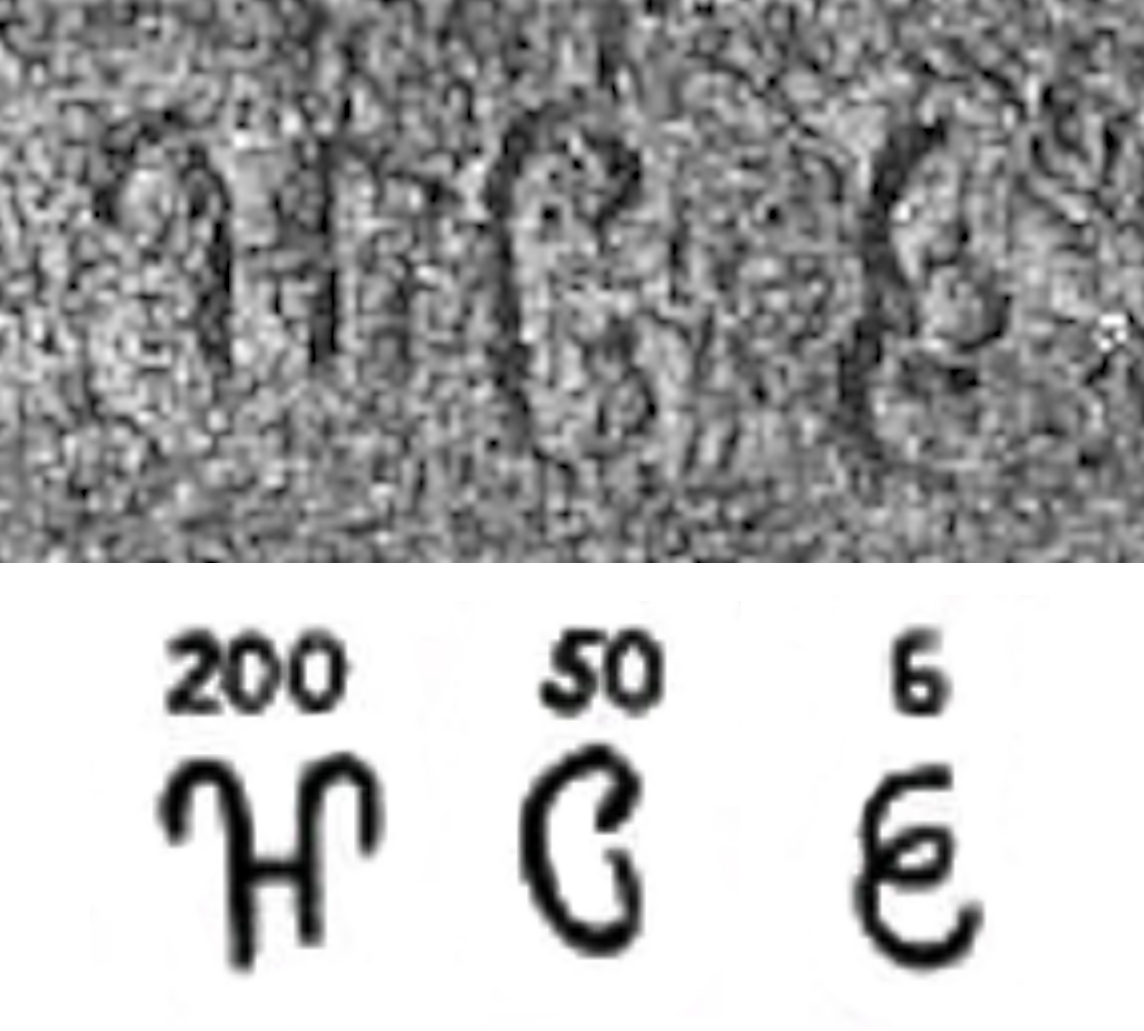
The number "256" towards the end of the Edict.

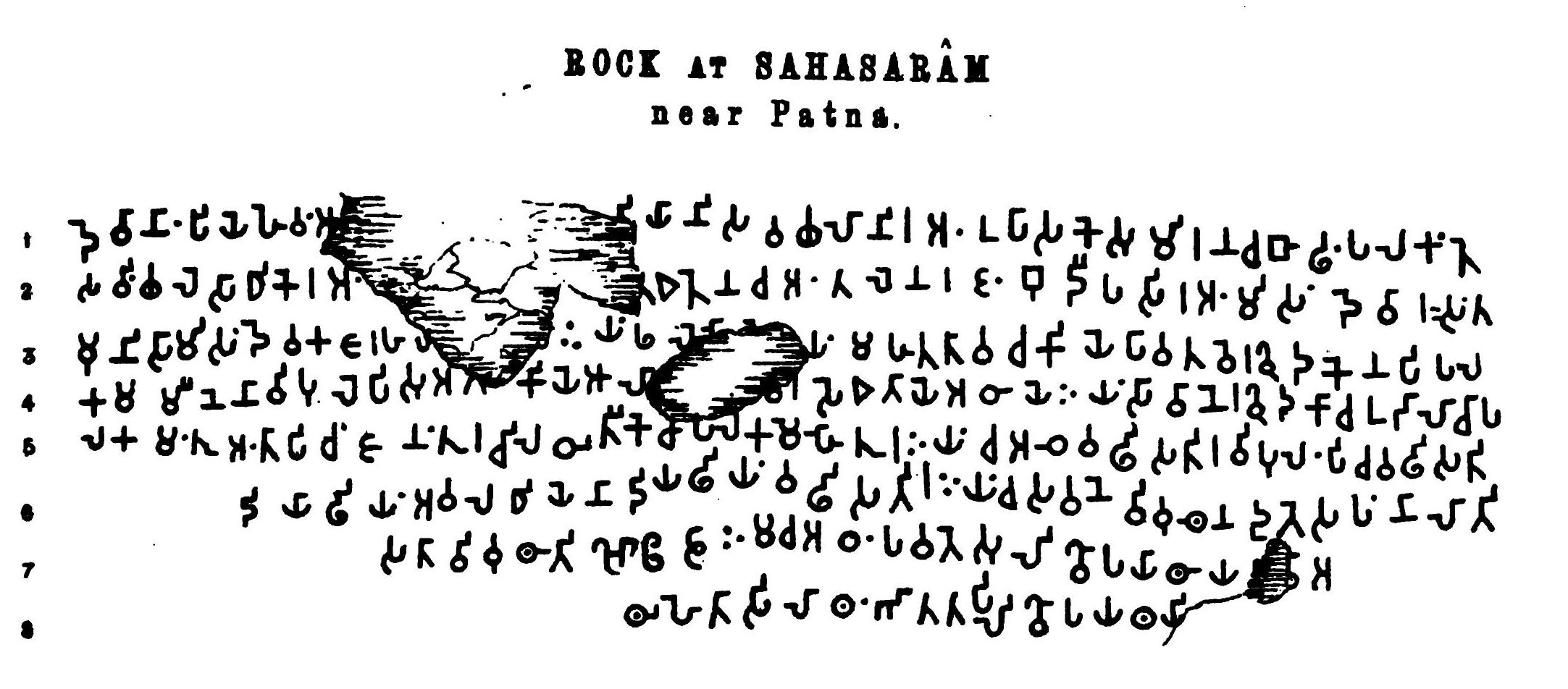
Transcription of the Edict.

== Geography ==
Sasaram is located at 24.95°N 84.03°E and occupies an area of about 15 km^{2} (5.8 sq mi). It has an average elevation of 110 metres (360 ft). The plateau region of Kaimur Range near Sasaram has an average elevation of 210 metres (690 ft).

=== Climate ===
Sasaram is surrounded by hills from two sides, and its climate is seasonable. The climate is characterized by relatively high temperatures and evenly distributed precipitation throughout the year. The Köppen Climate Classification sub-type for this climate is "Cfa" (humid subtropical).

Climate data for Sasaram, India
Month	Jan	Feb	Mar	Apr	May	Jun	Jul	Aug	Sep	Oct	Nov	Dec	Year
Mean daily maximum °C (°F)	23.8 (74.8)	26.7 (80.1)	32.7 (90.9)	38.0 (100.4)	40.9 (105.6)	38.5 (101.3)	33.2 (91.8)	32.0 (89.6)	32.4 (90.3)	31.8 (89.2)	28.1 (82.6)	24.1 (75.4)	31.9 (89.3)
Daily mean °C (°F)	16.2 (61.2)	18.9 (66.0)	24.2 (75.6)	29.6 (85.3)	33.2 (91.8)	32.8 (91.0)	29.2 (84.6)	28.4 (83.1)	28.2 (82.8)	25.9 (78.6)	20.7 (69.3)	16.5 (61.7)	25.3 (77.6)
Mean daily minimum °C (°F)	8.8 (47.8)	11.1 (52.0)	15.8 (60.4)	21.2 (70.2)	25.5 (77.9)	27.0 (80.6)	25.3 (77.5)	24.8 (76.6)	23.9 (75.0)	20.0 (68.0)	13.3 (55.9)	8.9 (48.0)	18.8 (65.8)
Average rainfall mm (inches)	19.2 (0.76)	21.2 (0.83)	14.3 (0.56)	7.6 (0.30)	12.2 (0.48)	120.9 (4.76)	297.5 (11.71)	326.2 (12.84)	181.5 (7.15)	50.9 (2.00)	10.2 (0.40)	3.6 (0.14)	1,065.3 (41.93)
Average rainy days	1.5	1.8	1.5	1.0	1.4	5.9	14.3	14.3	8.9	2.8	0.5	0.8	54.7
Source: Weatherbase

== Demographics ==
Religions Sasaram City (2020 )
Hinduism	72.97%
Islam	25.58%
Sikhism	1.25%
Christianity	0.10%
Jainism	0.02%
Buddhism	0.01%
Not Stated	0.25%
Distribution of religions

According to the 2011 census, Sasaram had a population of 351,408 but in urban agglomeration. Males constitute 52% of the population and females 48%. Sasaram has an average literacy rate of 80.26%, higher than the national average of 74%; male literacy is 85%, and female literacy is 75%. In Sasaram, 13% of the population is under 6 years of age.

As of 2011, Sasaram was the 8th most populous city in Bihar.

== Governance ==
The eKiosk (Sahaj Vasudha Kendra, Jamuhar)

SAHAJ Vasudha Kendra, the first "Common Service Centre", or "eKiosk", in Rohtas District was inaugurated in Jamuhar village on 15 August 2008. The centre is currently planning to start a block information Centre, e-district plan, and Sawan Sasaram.

=== Lok Sabha constituency ===
Sasaram (Lok Sabha constituency) is one of the 40 parliamentary constituencies of the Lok Sabha in Bihar. Manoj Kumar (Sasaram politician) serves as a Member of Parliament (MP) representing Sasaram in the Lok Sabha.

=== Vidhan Sabha constituency ===
Sasaram Assembly constituency is one of 243 constituencies of the Bihar Legislative Assembly. It comes under Sasaram Lok Sabha constituency.

== Economy ==
The closure of the industries of the Dalmia Group at Dalmianagar resulted in widespread unemployment. Sasaram's economy is mainly driven by agriculture and related industries like rice polishing. The canal irrigation system is also very prominent in this area. Because of the fertile land around the town, it is a local trading center for food grains, agricultural products, and agricultural equipment; the region is known as Dhan Ka Katora, meaning "a bowl of food grains". The rice grown near Sasaram is sold in the markets of Kolkata and New Delhi. The only significant industry is rock quarrying.

== Transportation ==
=== Railway ===
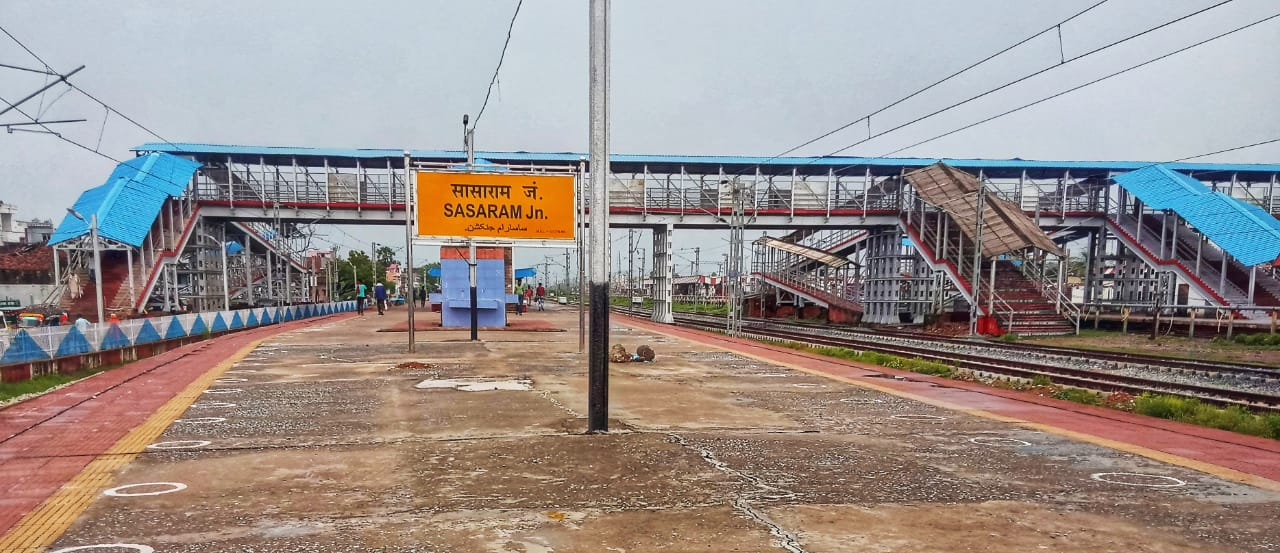
Sasaram station

Sasaram Junction station, a major railway station, serves Sasaram. Sasaram's other stations are Shivsagar, Kumahu, Nokha, Karwandiya, Pahleja and Dehri on Sone.

Sasaram station is 101 km (63 mi) away from Pt. Deen Dayal Upadhaya station (less than 1.5 hours), about 120 km (75 mi) or two hours journey from Varanasi, and 101 km (63 mi) from Gaya station. Gaya station is 20 km (12 mi) away from Bodh Gaya, the most sacred place in Buddhism. Trains run from Sasaram to Kolkata, Arrah, Ranchi, Patna, New Delhi, and Bikramganj.

The trains which stop in Sasaram include Ajmer Seldah, Kalka Mail, Purushottam Express, Mahabodhi Express, Ranchi Garib Rath, Kolkata Mail, Jodhpur Howrah Express, Chambal Express, Shipra Express, Chennai Egmore Express, Nandan Kanan Express, Neelanchal Express and Poorva Express, Jallianwalabagh Express, Durigana Express, Garbha Express, Dikshabhoomi Express and New Delhi-Bhagalpur Express, etc.

=== Airport ===
Suara Airfield, a small and old airport in Sasaram, is currently non-operational. The closest major airports are in Gaya, Bihar (98 kilometers away), Patna, Bihar (157 kilometers away), and Varanasi, Uttar Pradesh (120 kilometers away)

== Education ==
Sasaram is the sixth most literate city in Bihar, with Rohtas being the most literate district in Bihar.

There are four government colleges, although many students prefer to go to more developed cities for quality higher education, such as Bangalore, New Delhi, Pune, Patna, Varanasi and Puducherry. A new engineering college has been set up in the region.

This place is also known for preparation of competitive exams at Sasaram Railway junction. According to earlier natives of this city, there was not proper electrification of city around 2007 to 2008, which hampered the studies of students seeking for competitive exams. Indian Railways had a 24-hour power supply at Sasaram junction, leading a small group of students to study there at night under electric lights.

=== Universities ===
- Gopal Narayan Singh University,
- Veer Kunwar Singh University

=== Medical colleges ===
- Narayan Medical College and Hospital
- Mahatma Phule Medical College and Hospital, Muradabad, Sasaram
- Sher Shah Suri Medical Hospital & Training college, Sasaram

=== Engineering colleges ===
- Shershah Engineering College

=== Government colleges ===
- Shanti Prasad Jain College, Sasaram [a facilitation branch of Veer Kunwar Singh University, Arrah]
- Shri Shankar College, Sasaram
- Sher Shah College, Sasaram
- Rohtas Mahila College, Sasaram

=== Other colleges ===
- Hari Narain Singh Institute of Teachers Education (HNSITE)
- Shakuntalam Institute of Teachers Education
- Shakuntalam Industrial Training Institute
- Sri Shankar Rajkiya Inter College
- Government Polytechnic, Dehri, Sasaram
- Jagannath Mishra Law College, Sasaram

=== Major schools ===
- PM SHRI Kendriya Vidyalaya, Sasaram
- St. Michael's Academy School, Chandravanshi Nagar, Fazalganj, Sasaram
- M. P. High School, Adda Road, Sasaram
- Rama Rani Jain Girls High School, Choukhandi Road, Sasaram
- Bal Vikas Vidyalaya, Tomb Road, Sasaram
- Bal Bharti Public School, Sasaram
- D.A.V. Public school, Admapur, Sasaram
- St. Paul's School, Sasaram
- St. Xavier's School, Jagdev Nagar, Nooran Ganj, Sasaram
- G.S. Residential School, Malwar Road, Sasaram
- St. Jeelani's Public School, Shahjuma, Sasaram
- Pragya Niketan Public School, Falzalganj, Sasaram
- Buddha Mission School, Nooranganj, Bauliya Road, Sasaram Rohtas Bihar
- ABR Foundation School, Baijla More, Sasaram

== Villages ==
Besides the city of Sasaram itself, there are 171 villages in Sasaram block, of which 144 are inhabited and 27 are uninhabited. As of 2011, the total rural population of Sasaram block is 210,875, in 34,336 households.

Villages in Sasaram block
Village name	Total land area (hectares)	Population (in 2011)
Dhanarhi	75.3	745
Fatehpur	55.1	186
Danwarua	47	0
Patanwan	116.6	454
Mosahebpur	81.4	879
Rasulpur	87.7	804
Bhikhanpura	132	0
Samarodiha	323.3	1,995
Chaukhanda Chitauli	140.4	1,408
Shivpur Chitauli	44.9	1,146
Turki	69.6	2,113
Lodhi	48.6	395
Barawan	60.6	820
Uttimpur Haraha	33	0
Belthua	60.8	487
Banrasia	55.4	2,585
Belarhi	160.3	2,886
Singuhi	108.1	1,653
Patanwan	38	0
Kataprath	27	0
Naugain	82.1	548
Khairi	105.3	437
Khaira	112.6	1,421
Niranjanpur	17	400
Bishunpura	54.7	0
Mahranian	20.6	652
Bhadokhara	186.2	2,988
Belahar	76.4	1,199
Sikaria	1,171.9	4,934
Kota	206.4	2,303
Rajokhar	118.3	0
Ashikpur	37	0
Hetimpur	12	653
Karpurwa	35.7	2,709
Bhatarhi	71.2	839
Beda	69.2	1,852
Kanserwa	72.2	0
Lakhrawan	8.8	0
Mohaddi Ganj	44.1	3,240
Dhanpurwa	20.4	1,340
Dilia	33.8	0
Mirzapur	3	0
Udhopur	43.7	136
Madaini	254.9	815
Sumbha	70.8	745
Ahrawan	128.7	705
Misripur	56.7	532
Madauria	50	161
Dhunan	67.2	708
Karam Dihri	146.9	1,371
Tetari	91.1	709
Haripur	24.7	53
Kuraich	35	1,598
Takia	8.7	5
Muradabad Kalan	144.8	4,291
Muradabad Khurd	154.2	2,310
Uchitpur	174	3,794
Nekara	140.8	2,056
Neae	131.1	1,644
Baradih	121.8	3,202
Nimia	102.4	792
Kothara	156.2	929
Bhagwanpur	93.9	626
Semra	80.1	617
Bajila	104.8	1,112
Gamharia	67.2	707
Mokar	372.7	3,409
Agrer	263.8	3,774
Rakasia	124.2	1,867
Jhalkhoria	50.2	779
Akasi	391.8	4,145
Kunrwa	106.4	1,064
Pipri	137.2	945
Katdehri	199.8	1,137
Gotpa	228.3	1,961
Maudiha	85.4	1,010
Kharaunia	101.6	756
Sumbha	178.4	830
Garara	206.8	2,461
Rudana	106.8	1,020
Rajekarma	49.4	0
Babhanpurwa	46.1	465
Gobina	89	1,039
Karup	117.3	1,636
Dilia	62.3	856
Lok Dehri	62.8	686
Inaihia	57.9	546
Bhainsahi	172.8	1,041
Bishunpura	76.1	696
Bhajea	103	0
Jaipur	139.2	1,359
Nirmalpur	38	302
Nirmalpur	72.8	0
Rampur	287	2,895
Semra	148	186
Bahrar	143	1,355
Khanra	81.4	588
Patia	118	1,476
Dumaria	86	1,301
Kaupa Dih	89	624
Bajinathpur	39	0
Gansa Dih	170	2,695
Chhotka Mor	76.4	1,191
Barka Mor	201	1,439
Pasia Dih	35	433
Bara Dih	121	418
Basuhara	89	683
Nahauna	288	3,208
Bhorman	64	429
Koiria Dih	36	0
Paisara	107	890
Tiwari Dih	36	314
Bhurekunria	18	341
Belwa	101	675
Khurhunu	178	1,684
Jigina	178	754
Tendua	101	1,150
Bararhi	134	1,507
Shahpur	90	1,099
Bishunpur	62	858
Chaubea	57	584
Bisrampur	138	1,907
Karwania	131	3,446
Basa	101.1	2,683
Jagdaun Dih	48.6	400
Durgapur	87.9	1,057
Amra, Sasaram	205.6	4,944
Amri, Sasaram	197.4	5,527
Dawanpur	238.4	2,544
Karma	136	538
Nima	68.4	580
Ghatmapur	75.6	821
Basantpur	164.8	1,084
Admapur	213.7	1,746
Gaeghat	209	1,481
Fazilpur	123	334
Gajdwahi	327.8	2,678
Kanchanpur	480	2,865
Kurdaun	322	711
Dhankarha	113.3	2,696
Lerua	100.8	2,984
Mednipur	146.9	2,084
Dhaudanr	1,125.4	5,816
Mahua Dihra	2,713	0
Jawarh	662.1	0
Palangarh	580.3	0
Kauria	85	0
Tendua	202.7	702
Murhi	120.1	2,071
Karserua	269.1	2,309
Gharbair	269.9	1,344
Barui	265	1,238
Songawan	288.6	2,188
Mundi Sarae	121	0
Molawan	273.1	2,638
Sakas	156.6	1,014
Dhanpurwa	45.4	298
Kusri	127.1	1,417
Dubaulia	25.9	0
Khairi	35.2	72
Babura	45	707
Khaira	115	831
Bichhia	25	0
Darigawan	362	5,964
Agni	133	626
Jamahath	135	680
Karaunia	316	0
Tikra	195	0
Ramgaraha	1,168	0
Goria	4,072	316
shiwan	312	3023

== Notable people ==
- Sher Shah Suri, Emperor of India, conquered the Mughal Empire, defeating 2nd Mughal emperor Humayun
- Chhedi Paswan, former Member of Parliament, ex-MLA
- Sanjay Nirupam, Ex-Member of Parliament Mumbai North, Ex-Member of Parliament, Rajya Sabha
- Murari Prasad Gautam, Ex-Minister in Eighth Nitish ministry
- Vijay Kumar, molecular biologist
- Akash Deep, Indian cricketer, a squad member of Royal Challengers Bangalore in Indian Premier League
- Kavi Kumar Azad, famous for his role in TV serial Taarak Mehta Ka Ooltah Chashmah as Dr. Hansraj Hathi
- Jyoti Prakash Nirala, recipient of Ashok Chakra posthumously in 2018

== See also ==
- Shergarh Fort
