= Manjhar Kund =

Waterfalls in Rohtas District, Bihar, India

- Location within Bihar
- Location: Sasaram, Rohtas, Bihar, India
- Coordinates: 24.8903425°N 84.0418130°E
- Type: Cascade, Segmented
- Elevation: 200 m (660 ft)
- Total height: 4.5 m (15 ft)
- Number of drops: 3
- Average width: 50 m (160 ft)
- Watercourse: Kav river

The Manjhar Kund waterfall situated in the Kaimur Range near Sasaram, the district headquarters of Rohtas District in Bihar. It is a Cascade and segmented type waterfall on the Kav River and it depends on the rainy season. This is one of the finest waterfall in Bihar.

== Festival ==
After Raksha Bandhan, people come to visit Manjhar Kund. It is a favorite picnic spot for tourists during the rainy season.

== See also ==
- List of waterfalls
- List of waterfalls in India
