= Dhua Kund =

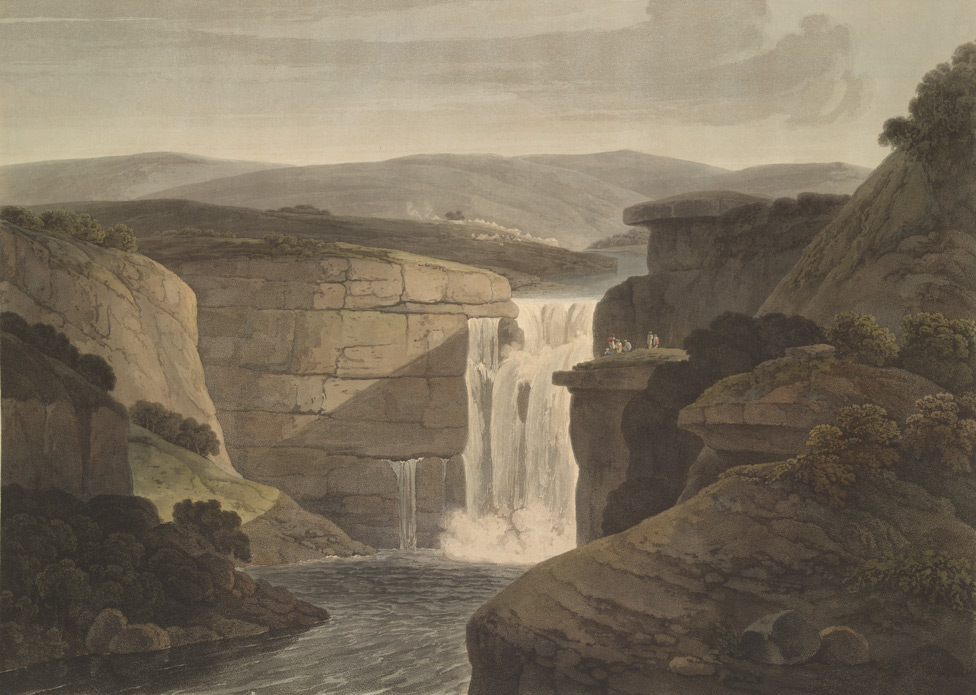
- Dhuah Koonde, ca. 1803, by Thomas Daniell

- Location within Bihar
- Location: Sasaram, Rohtas, Bihar, India
- Coordinates: 24.8916537°N 84.0444328°E
- Type: Cataract, Segmented
- Elevation: 180 m (590 ft)
- Total height: 37.1 m (122 ft)
- Number of drops: 1
- Average width: 12 m (39 ft)
- Watercourse: Kav river

The Dhua Kund are the pair of waterfalls situated in the Kaimur Range near Sasaram. These are cataract and segmented type waterfalls on the Kav river. These waterfalls depend on the rainy season and they have the capacity to generate 50-120 MW of hydroelectricity.

== Festival ==
Every year on Raksha Bandhan, a festival is organized in the premises of these waterfalls.

== See also ==
- List of waterfalls
- List of waterfalls in India
