= Musaharniya Dih =

Archaeological site in Bihar, India

- मुसहरनिया डीह (Maithili)
- Type: Archaeological Site
- Cultures: Hinduism and Buddhism
- Location: Paston Navtoli Village, Andhra Tharhi, Madhubani district, Mithila region, Bihar
- Region: Mithila region

History
- Built: Either Pala Dynasty or King Harisimhadeva

Site notes
- Architectural styles: Buddhist Vihāra and Karnat Dynasty's Royal Palace
- Public access: Public place

Musaharniya Dih ( Maithili: मुसहरनिया डीह ) is an archeological site in Madhubani district of the Mithila region in Bihar, India. It is located at Paston village around 40 km distance from the district headquarter. The site is claimed as either Buddhist Mahavihara or ruins of the royal palace of King Hari Singh Dev of the Karnat dynasty in Mithila.

== Description ==
The archeological site is located at Navtoli Paston village which is just four kilometers away from Andharathadhi block headquarter. There are some mounds on the site. Apart from two big mounds, there are four small mounds. While ploughing and spading near the site, small statues of Buddha and used earthen pots are found around. Some of them sculptures are kept in the local Vachaspati Museum. According to the local teacher Parmeshwar Bhandari of Navtoli Middle School "about 7-8 years ago, excavation work was started in this area, in which it was revealed that historical evidence was found, but after a few months, the excavation work was stopped for some reason." According to Hariom Sharan, the resident of Navtoli village "Since it is a public place with no restriction from the administration, the people living nearby not only dig up and take away soil from here, but also dig up and take away bricks that contain historical evidence. In 2017, the Director of the Art and Culture Department had directed the then District Administrator S K Ashok to preserve the bricks and other materials from all the mounds of Paston Musaharniya Deeh. But due to negligence in the protection of site from the government, the evidences of the archeological site are disappearing with unauthorised digging by the local villagers.

== Buddhist Mahavihara ==
The site was first surveyed by Dr. P K Jha, the then head of Bihar Circle of the Archaeological Survey Department of the Government of India. He said that there was once a huge and advanced Buddhist Mahavihara. It is said that many Buddhist stupas and Buddhist Vihars were constructed by the kings of the Pala dynasty around the surrounding areas of Paston Navtoli village in Andhra Tharhi block. According to archaeologist Bhairab Lal Das, about 1200 years ago, the Pala dynasty's kings of Mithila had constructed a Buddha stupa here. According to some historians, travellers coming from China and Tibet and going from India to Tibet and China used to stop at this Buddhist monastery. There is a mention of Bihar's Pattan village in Buddhist literature written by a famous Chinese traveller whose geographical location, social customs, foods etc. and the surrounding villages are similar to this Pastan village. Similarly the distance of Janakpur from this village mentioned in that literature matches exactly. According to archaeologist Pandit Sahdev Jha, Musaharniya Deeh of Paston village was the place of stay of Buddhist monks where they come to study. Similarly Retired DSP from the vigilance department Indra Narayan Jha has also considered it as a Buddhist monastery in his works Mithila Digdarshan. According to Dr. Shivkumar Mishra, curator of the Lakshmeshwar Singh Museum of the Archaeological Survey of India, earlier it was a Mahavihara. At least nine pillars of it are still intact. Pravartanpur Sudhavihar is mentioned in the verse inscribed on the idol of Buddha Bhagwati Tara in Andhara Thadhi. It is believed that the same Pravartanpur later became famous as Paston.

== Ruins of Harisingh Deva's Royal Palace ==
According to some scholars, Pattan itself has been corrupted over time to become Pastan. It is said that the mounds at Musaharniya Deeh is the ruins of Royal Palace of the King Harisimha Deva in Karnat Dynasty of Mithila. It has also been mentioned in the book Mithila Vimarsh Tatva. Presently there is Harisinghdev Sanskrit Middle and High School named after him.
