= Vachaspati Sangrahālaya =

Museum in Mithila region

- Established: 1969
- Location: Andhra Tharhi, Madhubani district, Mithila region, Bihar, India
- Type: Archaeological museum
- Key holdings: Department of Culture and Youth, Bihar Government
- Founder: Pandit Sahdev Jha
- Curator: Pandit Haridev Jha
- Owner: Government of Bihar

Vachaspati Sangrahālaya is a museum of antiquities found in the region of the Andhra Tharhi block in the Mithila region of India. It is located at Andhra Tharhi village in the Madhubani district of Bihar. It was established in 1969. The museum was over taken by the Government of Bihar in the 2000. The museum is named after the eminent Indian philosopher Vachaspati Mishra.

== Description ==
The Vachaspati Sangrahālaya was established with the purpose of preserving archaeological antiquities found in the region of the Andhra Tharhi block in the Madhubani district. In the Andhra Tharhi block, lots of archaeological remains have been found from time to time. These archaeological items have been kept in the museum of Vachaspati Sangrahālaya. In the region, there are several archaeological sites like Musaharniya Dih, Kamaladitya Sthan and Vachaspati Mishra Dih, etc. From these archaeological sites, several antiquities and ancient idols, etc. are excavated or suddenly found in different times. Then these are kept at this museum for preservation.
