= Trikāṇḍī =

Trikāṇḍī ("Three books") is a Sanskrit treatise on the philosophy of language and grammar (vyākaraṇa), written by the 5th-century Indian grammarian and philosopher Bhartṛhari. Some 19th-20th century printed editions refer to it by the title Vākyapadiya, which is actually the title of a part of it. Bhartṛhari's work is significant for its comprehensive treatment of the relationship between language, thought, and reality.

== Naming ==
Trikāṇḍī which literally means three books, is the name of the works. However, the early printed editions of the work, such as those from 1888 and 1905, incorrectly presented Vākyapadiya as the title of the entire collection containing the three books. Vākyapadiya originally referred only to the second book of the collection, and later came to refer to the first two books.

The term "Vākya-padiya" likely referred to the first two books by time of Vṛṣabha (c. 650), and definitely in the time of Hela-raja (c. 980) and Vardhamana (the author of Gana-ratna-mahodadhi, c. 1140). Scholar Ashok Aklujkar theorizes that Bhartṛ-hari originally conceived the three books as "relatively independent" treatises, but later thought of unifying them into a single work. However, he died after composing commentaries (vṛtti) on the first two books. Dharma-pala (6th century) wrote the vṛtti on the third book.

== Structure and content ==
Trikāṇḍī comprises three books (kāṇḍas):

1. Agama-samuchchaya ("Collection of traditionally received knowledge") or Brahma-kāṇḍa ("Book of Brahman)
2. Vākya-padiya or Vākya-kāṇḍa ("Book of Sentences")
3. Prakirna(ka) ("Miscellany") or Pada-kāṇḍa ("Book of Words")

The alternative titles - Brahma-kāṇḍa, Vakyā-kāṇḍa, and Pada-kāṇḍa - likely do not originate from the author.

The text presents Vedas as the organizing principle of the world, serving not just as a guide (upadestr) for proper conduct and knowledge, but as the underlying essence (prakrti) of the universe, suggesting that the Veda is both the source of knowledge and the foundation of the world's existence.

The first two parts are divided into kārikās (verses) and vṛtti (commentary). Since the earliest times, tradition attributes the authorship of the vṛttis to Bhartṛhari himself, although some manuscripts name Harivṛṣabha alias Vṛṣabha as their author.

The structure of the text provides a holistic view of language, encompassing its philosophical foundations, sentence structurer, and word formation.

=== Brahmakāṇḍa ===
The Brahmakāṇḍa discusses the concept of Brahman, stating that it "creates the diversity of the world out of language". It briefly discusses the Vedic branches and the Vedas as a source of rites, smṛti, schools of philosophy, and traditional knowledge. The author highlights the importance of the grammar (vyakarana), calling it "the door to liberation", and describing it as the first among the six auxiliary sciences, because other sciences can be understood only through it.

The text then discusses various topics, including words, meanings, and the relationship between them; the scope of grammar; linguistic forms; sphota; cognizance of the sound, etc. The author states that children understand language because of "dispositional tendencies" from their previous births; they attempt to speak out of intuition, not because they are taught to speak. In the vrtti, the author explains that something that exists is as good as non-existent unless spoken of using language; similarly, non-existent things become as good as real when language brings them to one's mind.

The author describes language as the basis of all branches of knowledge, and of all arts and crafts. He discusses the relationship between language and other concepts, such as cognition, consciousness, merit, spirituality, and scriptures. He also discusses the use of incorrect linguistic forms (apabhramsha).

=== Vākyakāṇḍa ===
The author lists various definitions of a sentence by different authorities, such as Katyayana, the Mimamsa school, and different logicians (nyaya-vadins). He then discusses the concept of sphota, and various views regarding the divisibility and indivisibility of a sentence and its meaning.

The author discusses 12 views regarding the meaning of linguistic forms. He lists six varieties of intuition, and discusses the role of intuition in understanding the meaning of a sentence. He then discusses constituents of words (such as prefix, suffix, stem, and roots); linguistic forms (nouns, verbs, prepositions, particles, and postpositions); phonemes; compound words; homophones; concatenations of words.

The author states that one must distinguish between the possible and intended meanings of the linguistic forms, and discusses various factors that determine the meaning. He also discusses various views on the relationship between language and meaning. For example, some people think that language only produces a memory, it does not establish the meaning: a burned man understands the meaning of burning when he comes in contact with fire, as opposed to learning the meaning of the word "burning" through language. The author also discusses other related topics, such as completeness of a sentence, emphasis, and related topics.

In the epilogue, the author talks about different grammar traditions of India, stating that his teacher had mastered all of them. He mentions several earlier scholars, including Panini, Patanjali, Chandra, Baiji, Saubhava, and Haryaska. He states that it is important to learn about various traditions and the works of earlier scholars.

=== Padakāṇḍa ===
The final book is focused on individual words, their formation, and their meanings. The rules governing the formation and interpretation of words is also discussed here.

Book 3 comprises 14 chapters (samuddeśas):

1. On Universal Property (Jāti-samuddeśa)
2. On Substance (Dravya-samuddeśa)
3. On Relation (Saṃbandha-parīkṣā)
  - Here Bhartṛ-hari discusses a paradox about how unnameable things can be approached through language.
4. More on Substance (Bhūyodravya-samuddeśa)
5. On Quality (Guṇa-samuddeśa)
6. On Spatial Direction (Dik-samuddeśa)
7. On the Means to Action (Sādhana-samuddeêa)
8. On Action (Kriyā-samuddeśa)
9. On Time (Kāla-samuddeśa)
10. On Person (Puruṣa-samuddeśa)
11. On Number (Saṃkhyā-samuddeśa)
12. On Aspect (Upa-graha-samuddeśa)
13. On Gender (Liṅga-samuddeśa)
14. On Linguistic Formations (Vṛtti-samuddeśa)

== Commentaries ==
The following commentaries of the work are known:

Book 1

- Original, longer vritti by Bhartṛ-hari or Hari-vṛṣabha (Note: Some manuscripts attributed the authorship of the kārikā and the vritti to Hari-vṛṣabha.)
- Shorter vritti by an unknown redactor
- Paddhati or Sphutakshara, a tika by Vṛṣabha-deva. Hari-vṛṣabha alias Vṛṣabha (c. 650 CE) was a son of Deva-yashas and a protege of king Vishnu-gupta; his Vakyapadiya-paddhati is the earliest known commentary on Bhartṛ-hari's work, composed by someone other than Bhartṛ-hari.

Book 2

- Original vritti by Bhartṛ-hari or Hari-vṛṣabha
- A tika, probably titled Vakya-pradipa, by Punya-raja or Rajanaka-shura-varman; this work contains an explanation of the kārikās
- A summary in verses of the tika by Punya-raja or Rajanaka-shura-varman; this was likely a summary of a now-lost commentary by Hela-raja
- Vākya-padiya-prameya-samgraha, a summary of the tika, by an unknown redactor

Book 3

- Prakirna-vrtti by the Yogachara teacher Dhrama-pala (6th-7th century); this work is now lost, and is known from the Chinese tradition and I-tsing. The title Prakirna-vrtti is known from Durveka Mishra's Dharmottara-pradipa.
- Prakirna[ka]-prakasha by Hela-raja, with two gaps filled by Phulla-raja (likely same as Punya-raja (Note: "Phulla" as a variation of "Punya" may have originated because of a misreading of the Sharada script.)); this work contains an explanation of the kārikās

== Editions ==
- 1887: Gangadhara-shastri Manavalli's edition containing
  - the kārikās and shorter vṛtti of the first book
  - the kārikās and tika of the second book
- 1934: Charu-deva Shastri's edition containing
  - the kārikās nad the longer vṛtti of the first book
  - excerpts from Vṛṣabha's tika
- 1935: K. Samba-shiva-shastri's edition of chapters 8-13 of the third book and Hela-raja's commentary on these
- 1941: Charu-deva Shastri's incomplete edition of the kārikās and vṛtti of the second book
- 1942: L.A. Ravi Varma's edition of hcapter 14 of the third bok and Hela-raja's tika on it
- K.A. Subramania Iyer's editions, with English translations
  - 1963: chapters 1-7 of the third book and Hela-raja's commentary on these
  - 1966: Complete text of Vṛṣabha's tika to the first book
  - 1973: Chapters 8-14 of the third book and Hela-raja's tika on these
- 1977: Wilhelm Rau's edition of the kārikās of the three books
