= Shabda =

Sanskrit term referring to utterance in the sense of linguistic performance

Shabda (Sanskrit: शब्द, IAST: Śabda) is the Sanskrit word for "speech sound". In Sanskrit grammar, the term refers to an utterance in the sense of linguistic performance. It also refers to relying on testimony of reliable experts as a means of knowledge.

== History ==
Om, or Aum, a sacred syllable of Hinduism, Buddhism, Jainism and Sikhism, is considered to be the first resonating vibrational sound within an individual being. It also denotes the non-dualistic universe as a whole. In Buddhism, Om corresponds to the crown chakra and white light.

Bhartrihari held a shabda-advaita position, identifying shabda as indivisible, and unifying the notions of cognition and linguistic performance, which is ultimately identical to Brahman. Bhartrhari recognised two entities, both of which may be referred to as shabda. One entity is the underlying cause of the articulated sounds, while the other entity is the functionality that is used to express meaning. Bhartrhari thus rejected the difference posited between the ontological and the linguistic by logicians. His concept of shabda-brahman which identified linguistic performance and creation itself ran parallel to the Greek concept of logos.

== Hinduism ==
Śabda (शब्द) means relying on word, testimony of past or present reliable experts, specifically the shruti, Vedas. Hiriyanna explains Sabda-pramana as a concept which means reliable expert testimony. The schools of Hinduism which consider it epistemically valid suggest that a human being needs to know numerous facts, and with the limited time and energy available, he can learn only a fraction of those facts and truths directly. He must rely on others, his parent, family, friends, teachers, ancestors and kindred members of society to rapidly acquire and share knowledge and thereby enrich each other's lives. This means of gaining proper knowledge is either spoken or written, but through Sabda (words). The reliability of the source is important, and legitimate knowledge can only come from the Sabda of reliable sources.

The following thinkers say that testimony is only authoritative when a topic cannot be known using sense perception and reason:

- Vedanta thinkers: Sankara, Ramanuja, Madhva,
- Samkhya thinker: Isvakrsna,
- Mimamsa thinkers: Sabara, Kumarila Bhatta.

For example, Madhva takes the authority of the Vedas as absolute only in matters such as understanding the nature of God. Shankara also specifies the scope of the scriptures for worldly matters. He says that the Upanishads have different descriptions of creation of the world because the point of the Upanishads is not to learn about the physical world, but to ultimately convey that the origin of the world is Brahman.

Discussion about the authority of scriptural language often lead philosophers to deliberate on the nature of words in general. They address questions such as the origin of our capacity to use language and how a word gets its meaning.

=== Carvaka ===
The various schools of philosophy differ on how to establish the reliability of testimony. Some schools, such as Carvaka, do not take Sabda to be a pramana.

=== Mimamsa vs Sphota ===
Language philosophy in Medieval India was dominated by the dispute between the Mimamsa school and the Sphota school. The Mimamsa school was notably defended by Kumarila, who held that shabda designates the actual phonetic utterance. The Sphota school, defended by Mandana Mishra, identified sphota and shabda as a mystical "indivisible word-whole". In classical Indian philosophy of language, the grammarian Katyayana stated that shabda ("speech") is eternal (nitya), as is artha "meaning", and that they share a mutual co-relation. According to Patanjali, the permanent aspect of shabda is sphoṭa ("meaning"), while dhvani ("sound, acoustics") is ephemeral to shabda.

The Mimamsa school argues that words and their meanings have an eternal relationship. There is not an author— human or divine— who decided at some point to connect a word with its meaning. Vaishnavas see scriptural language as not having a human author, but do take it to be authored by God. The Bhagavata Purana, for example, claims itself that it was spoken by God.

=== Nyaya ===
Nyaya does not agree with the Mimamsa view of language. According to Nyaya, words get their meaning when God, a community, or an authoritative person decides that a word should have a certain meaning. Gadadhara, a Nyaya philosopher, accepts that God decides the meanings of words, but humans also play a role. For example, grammarians like Panini can introduce new words into language. This view allows Nyaya thinkers to say that canonical texts like the Vedas are authoritative because authoritative people—sages — wrote them. Navya Nyaya thinkers argue that the Vedas are authoritative because God spoke them and God is the most reliable authority. Nyaya also argues that scriptures are trustworthy because following what they say leads to tangible results.

In Nyaya, testimony is the words of a reliable authority. A reliable authority is someone who

1. has directly, seen, reliably inferred, or heard about what they speak about;
2. has compassion for others;
3. and wants to give the knowledge they have to others.

=== Yoga ===
Yoga defines testimony similar to Nyaya. Testimony is what is spoken by a reliable person. A reliable person would not have any reason to lie.

For Yoga, though, the most important form of knowledge is sense experience because it is the way to prove there is self. Everyone has a unified experience even though they have changes in their sensory input and thoughts. This personal experience is what proves that there is a persistent, singular self. Moreoever, while words can describe an object in general and give conceptual knowledge, experience is what allows one to understand particular objects.

=== Vedanta ===
Shankara and Ramanuja argue that testimony of canonical texts is the only way to know Brahman. Since Brahman is said to be beyond the senses, one cannot know Brahman by inference because inference rests on perception.

For Jiva Goswami, testimony can override even sense perception, distinguishing him from Shankara, Ramanuja, and Madhva. While Jiva Goswami is criticized for going to an extreme, he specifies that his writing is not for a general reader, but for someone who seeks Krishna's refuge. He does not, though, reject the sense perception of the sages who recorded the Vedas. In fact, he takes the authority of the Bhagavata Purana to be rooted in that it is the testimony of those who perceive reality as it is. While Jiva Goswami doesn't rely on personal experience as authority, he sees personal experience of God as the aim of religious practice.

== Sikhism ==
In Sikhism, the term Shabad (Gurmukhi: ਸਬਦ) has two primary meanings.

The first context of the term is to refer to a hymn or paragraph or sections of the Holy Text that appears in Guru Granth Sahib, the main holy scripture of the Sikhs. The Guru Granth Sahib is organised by chapters of ragas, with each chapter containing many shabads of that raga. The first Shabad in Guru Granth Sahib is the Mool Mantar. The script used for the Shabad is Gurmukhi. Shabad is the term also used to refer to hymns within other Sikh scriptures, like Deh Siva Var Mohe. Shabad Vani is devotional singing of hymns from Sikh scriptures.

The second use of the term Shabad in Sikhism is for the holy name of God, Waheguru.

== Other faiths and philosophies ==
According to the Shabd path teachings of Sant Mat, Surat Shabd Yoga, Eckankar, Vardankar (a split-off from Eckankar), and Movement of Spiritual Inner Awareness, Shabd is the "Sound Current vibrating in all creation. It can be heard by the inner ears." Variously referred to as the Audible Life Stream, Inner Sound, Sound Current or Word in English, the Shabd is the esoteric essence of God which is available to all human beings.

== See also ==
- Contemporary Sant Mat movements
- Mantra
- Nada yoga
- Religious text
- Anahata

== Sources ==
- Bhawuk, Dharm P.S. (2011). Marsella, Anthony (ed.). Spirituality and Indian Psychology: Lessons From The Bhagavad-Gita. New York: Springer. doi:10.1007/978-1-4419-8110-3. ISBN 978-1-4419-8109-7. ISSN 1574-0455. LCCN 2011921339.
- Billimoria, Purusottama (1988). Śabdapramāṇa: Word and Knowledge. Studies of Classical India. Vol. 10. Dordrecht: Kluwer Academic. ISBN 978-94-010-7810-8 – via Internet Archive.
- Deutsche, Eliott (2000). Perrett, Roy (ed.). Philosophy of Religion: Indian Philosophy. Vol. 4. Routledge. ISBN 978-0815336112.
- Edelmann, Jonathan B. (26 January 2012). Hindu Theology and Biology: The Bhagavata Purana and Contemporary Theory. Oxford: Oxford University Press. doi:10.1093/acprof:oso/9780199641543.003.0004. ISBN 978-0-19-964154-3.
- Giamboi, Heather; Feldman, Allen (22 October 2015). Thousands of Visits to Heaven and the Heart of God: "The Most Profound, Vividly Detailed Out of Body Discoveries Yet!". Direct Path Publishing. ISBN 978-0996907309.
- Grimes, John A. (1989). A Concise Dictionary of Indian Philosophy: Sanskrit Terms Defined in English. New York: SUNY Press. ISBN 978-0791430675. LCCN 88036717 – via Internet Archive.
- Hiriyanna, Mysore (2000). The Essentials of Indian Philosophy. Delhi: Motilal Banarsidass. ISBN 978-8120813304.
- Patnaik, Tandra, Śabda : a study of Bhartrhari's philosophy of language, New Delhi : DK Printworld, 1994, ISBN 81-246-0028-7.
- Rambachan, Anantanand (1991). Accomplishing the Accomplished: The Vedas as a Source of Valid Knowledge in Sankara. University of Hawaiʻi Press. ISBN 978-0824813581.
- Singh, Kirpal (1949). A Great Saint, Baba Jaimal Singh. Ruhani Satsang Books, p. 7-9.
- Twitchell, Paul (1988). The Shariyat-Ki-Huray Book Two. Illuminated Way Publishing. ISBN 978-0996907378.
