= Vāchaspati Misra =

Indian Hindu philosopher

Vāchaspati Miśra

Personal life
- Born: 9th/10th century CE Vachaspati Mishra Dih, Mithila (modern-day Bihar, India)
- Died: unknown, 9th/10th century CE
- Spouse: Bhamati

Religious life
- Religion: Hinduism
- Philosophy: Advaita Vedanta, Hinduism

Vachaspati Mishra (IAST: Vācaspati Miśra), was a ninth or tenth century Indian Hindu philosopher of the Advaita Vedanta tradition, who wrote bhashya (commentaries) on key texts of almost every 9th-century school of Hindu philosophy. and harmonised Shankara's thought with that of Mandana Miśra, who until the 10th century was the most authoritative exponent of Advaita Vedanta. He also wrote an independent treatise on grammar, Tattvabindu, or Drop of Truth, which focuses on Mīmāṃsā theories of sentence meaning.

== Biography ==
Vāchaspati Misra was born into a Maithil Brahmin family in Andhra Tharhi, Madhubani, Bihar. Little is known about Vāchaspati Miśra's life, and the earliest text that has been dated with certainty is from 840 CE, and he was at least one generation younger than Adi Śaṅkara. However, an alternate date for the same text may be 976 CE, according to some scholars; a confusion that is based on whether Hindu Śaka or Vikrama era calendar is used for dating purposes.

He was a student of Maṇḍana Miśra, who was his main inspirator. He harmonised Shankara's thought with that of Mandana Miśra. (Note: The Bhamati and Vivarana Schools) According to Advaita tradition, Shankara reincarnated as Vachaspati Miśra "to popularise the Advaita System through his Bhamati."

He wrote so broadly on various branches of Indian philosophy that later Indian scholars called him the "one for whom all systems are his own", or in Sanskrit, a sarva-tantra-sva-tantra.

== Works ==
=== Bhāṣya ===
Vāchaspati Miśra was a prolific scholar and his writings are extensive, including bhasyas (commentaries) on key texts of almost every 9th-century school of Hindu philosophy, with notes on non-Hindu or nāstika traditions such as Buddhism and Charvaka.

Vāchaspati Miśra wrote the Bhamati, a commentary on Shankara's Brahma Sutra Bhashya, named after his devout wife, (Note: Pooja Kashyap: "Written in 10th century, 'Bhamati Tika' speaks of a woman Bhamati who for complete 18 years only lighted the lamp while her husband Vachaspati Mishra, a philosopher worked on the analysis of a text 'Brahma Sutra' given to him by the 6th Shankaracharya. After the text was over Mishra asked the lady lighting the diya beside him about her identity and in reply she said "I am your wife." Her husband was so touched to see her dedication that he named the book 'Bhamati Tika'.") and the Brahmatattva-samiksa, a commentary on Mandana Mishra's Brahma-siddhi. The Bhamati Tika was explained by Amalananda Swami in his sub commentary called Kalpataru during 1300 AD. Similarly the sub commentary Kalpataru was explained by Mahapandit Appaya Dikshit explained in his sub commentary called Parimal during 1600 AD. In 1983, Dr Ishwar Singh of Maharshi Dayanand University published a research book on Bhamati Tika known as "Bhamati: Ek Adhyayana". This book is an evaluation of Vachaspati Mishra in the context of Vedanta philosophy.

Other influential commentaries are Tattvakaumudi on Sāṃkhyakārika; Nyāyasucinibandha on Nyāya-sūtras; Nyāyakānika (an Advaita work on science of reason), Tattvasamikṣa (lost work), Nyāya-vārttika-tātparyaṭīkā (a subcommentary on the Nyāya-sūtras), Tattva-vaiśāradī on Yogasūtra.

While some known works of Vāchaspati Miśra are now lost, numerous others exist. Over ninety medieval era manuscripts, for example, in different parts of India have been found of his Tattvakaumudi, which literally means "Moonlight on the Truth". This suggests that his work was sought and influential. A critical edition of Tattvakaumudi was published by Srinivasan in 1967.

=== Tattvabindu - theory of meaning ===
In Tattvabindu Vachaspati Mishra develops principles of hermeneutics, and discusses the "Theory of Meaning" for the Mīmāṃsā school of Hindu philosophy. This is an influential work, and attempted to resolve some of the interpretation disputes on classical Sanskrit texts. Vāchaspati examines five competing theories of linguistic meaning:

- Mandana Misra's (sphoṭavāda), which involves grasping the meaning of a word or sentence by perceiving a sphoṭa or single holistic sound, which is distinct from the elements (sounds or characters) that make up the word or sentence;
- the Nyāya theory which involves concatenating the memory traces (saṃskāra) of momentary components of a word or sentence when we hear the final momentary component;
- the similar Mīmāmsā theory, according to which our grasp of the meaning of a sentence lies in the memory traces created by the words; and
- the Prābhākara Mīmāmsā theory, anvitābhidhānavāda, "the view on which denotation is constituted by what is connected." On this view, sentence-meaning is derived from the meanings of the words, which depend on the meaning of other words — no sphoṭa required; and
- the Bhāṭṭa Mīmāṃsā theory, abhihitānvayavāda, or "the view on which connection (anvaya) is constituted by what has been denoted." On this view, word-meaning is denoted entirely first (abhihita) and then individual word-meanings are connected by means of lakṣaṇā (implication). Vāchaspati concurs with the Bhāṭṭa view, when he employs in other contexts, such as the Nyāya sub-commentary, the Nyāya-vārttika-tātparya-ṭīkā, and the Tattva-vaiśāradī.

== Bhamati school ==
The Bhamati school, or Bhāmatī-Prasthāna, is named after Vāchaspati Miśra's commentary on Shankara's Brahma Sutra Bhashya, (Note: Rajesh Anand, Vachaspati Mishra) but several distinctive can be traced back to Maṇḍana Miśra's Brahmasiddhi. It sees the Jiva as the source or locus of avidya. According to the Bhamati School, while "Brahman is the object of Avidya." In the beginning of the Bhamati Tika, Vachaspati Mishra refers two kinds of Avidya. There are as many ignorances (Avidya ) as living beings. This school accepts Avchedavada (Excluding Distinction) regarding the nature of soul and God. Vachaspati Mishra considered that the Brahman bound by Maya (illusion) or Avidya is the living being, while the Brahman beyond Maya is God.

It sees meditation as the main factor in the acquirement of liberation, while the study of the Vedas and reflection are additional factors. Vachaspati Mishra belonged to a tradition of Advaita Vedanta known as Prasankhyanavada which believed in the "Dhyana Theory". It is the theory of continuous meditation. According to this theory, unlike the theory propounded by the Samuccayavādins, the performance of Karmas does not contribute to the attainment of "Brahman-Knowledge". According to this theory one should renounce performances of all the Karmas before going to start the practice of meditation. The practice of meditation is on the meaning of the mahavakya(great sentence) "Tat Tvam Asi" of Upanishad text. Vachaspati Mishra similar to Mandan Mishra believed that there should be no injunction during the practice of meditation because right knowledge of Vedantic teaching may be sublated by incorrect knowledge during the ordinary life.

== Commemoration ==
His birthplace has been designated as a historical place known as Vachaspati Mishra Dih, where his statue was installed, and later a library was built in 2012. Vachaspati Sangrahālaya, a museum of antiquities, was established in Andhra Tharhi and was named after him.

In 2019, the Department of Arts, Culture and Youth of Bihar Government had announced to celebrate two-day State Vachaspati Smriti Parva. The Brahmins of the village have a tradition of starting their children's letters with the soil of the ground at the Dih.

== Sources ==
- Chatterji, Jagadisha Chandra (1912). Hindu Realism.
- Isaeva, Natalia (1993). Shankara and Indian Philosophy. USA: State University of New York Press. ISBN 978-0-7914-1281-7.
- Fowler, Jeaneane (2002), Perspectives of Reality: An Introduction to the Philosophy of Hinduism, Sussex Academic Press, ISBN 978-1898723943
- Larson, Gerald James; Bhattacharya, Ram Shankar (1987), The Encyclopedia of Indian Philosophies, Volume 4, Princeton University Press
- Phillips, Stephen (2015). "Seeing From the Other's Point of View: Counter the Schismatic Interpretation of Vācaspati Miśra" (PDF). APA Newsletter: Asian and Asian-American Philosophers and Philosophies. 14 (2): 4–8.
- Roodurmun, Pulasth Soobah (2002), Bhāmatī and Vivaraṇa Schools of Advaita Vedānta: A Critical Approach, Delhi: Motilal Banarsidass Publishers Private Limited

== Bibliography ==
- Tattva-Kaumudi (Sankhya) of Vachaspati Misra , English translation with the Sanskrit text by Ganganatha Jha. Central Secretariat Library. 1896.
- Tattva Bindu (Sanskrit) by Vachaspati Misra Gangadhara, 1892.
- Sankhya Tattva Kaumudi by Vachaspati Misra (Org. Sanskrit) with Commentary Sankhya Tattva Vibhakara by Pandit Banshi Dhara Misra. Secretary Chowkhana Sanskrit Series. 1921
- Bhamati of Vachaspati Misra on Sankara's Brahmasutrabhasya in Sanskrit
- Vivada Chintamani by Vachaspati Misra, Commentary by Prossonno Komar Tagore (English). Asiatic Society. 1865
- Patanjal-Yoga-Darshanam with Vyasa-Bhasya, Tattva-Vaisharadi ( Sanskrit) by Vachaspati and Yogabhashyavarttika by Vijnanabhiksu
- Sankhya Karika Tattva Kaumudi Of Vachaspati Misra (Hindi) Hindi tr. by Ramshankar Bhattacharya. Motilal Banarasidass. 1967.
- S.S. Hasurkar, Vācaspati Miśra on Advaita Vedanta. Darbhanga: Mithila Institute of Post-Graduate Studies, 1958.
- Karl H. Potter, "Vācaspati Miśra" (in Robert L. Arrington [ed.]. A Companion to the Philosophers. Oxford: Blackwell, 2001. ISBN 0-631-22967-1)
- J.N. Mohanty, Classican Indian Philosophy. Oxford: Rowman & Littlefield, 2000. ISBN 0-8476-8933-6
- V.N. Sheshagiri Rao, Vācaspati's Contribution to Advaita. Mysore: Samvit Publishers, 1984.
