= Chandradhari Museum =

Museum in Darbhanga, Bihar, India

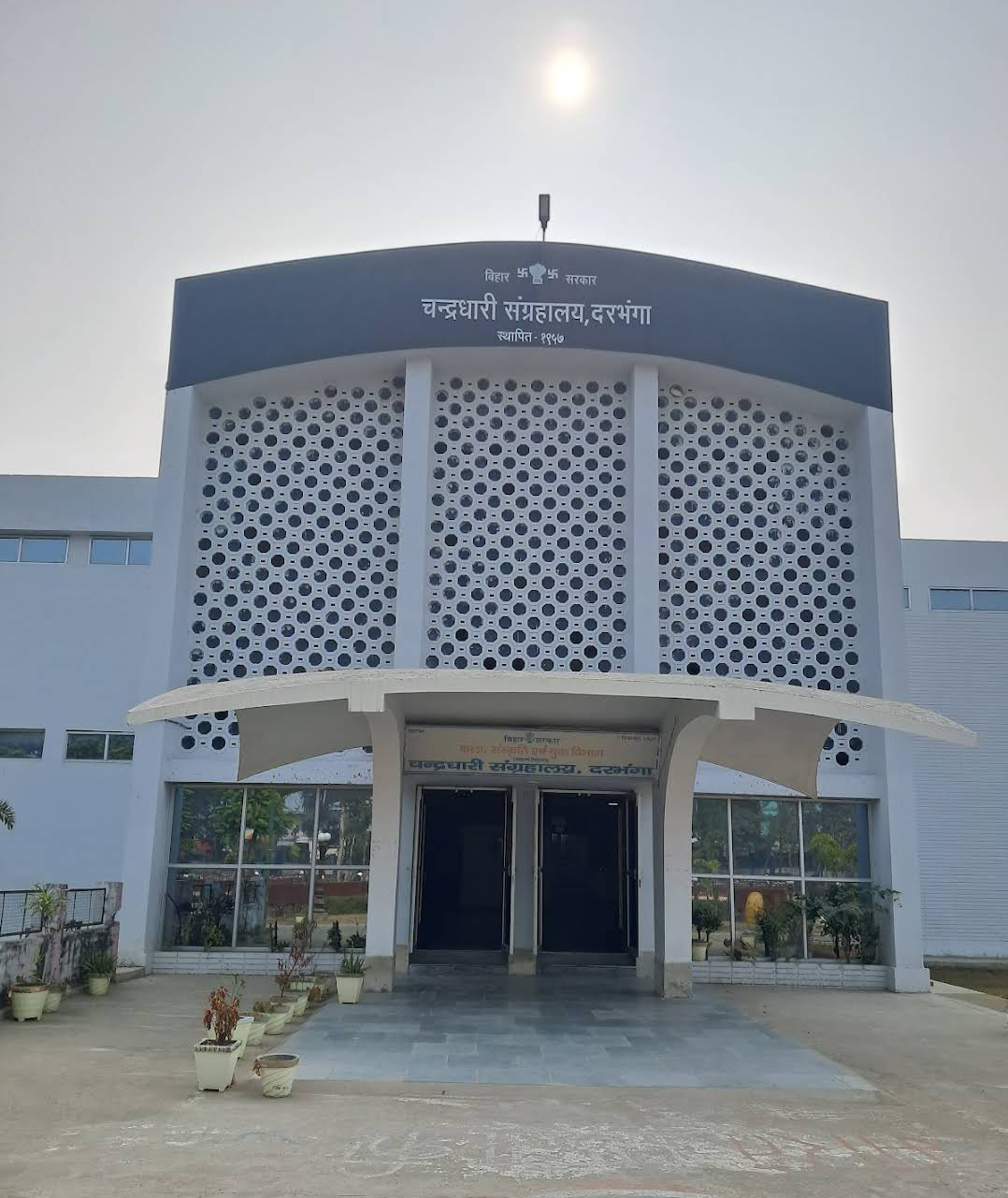
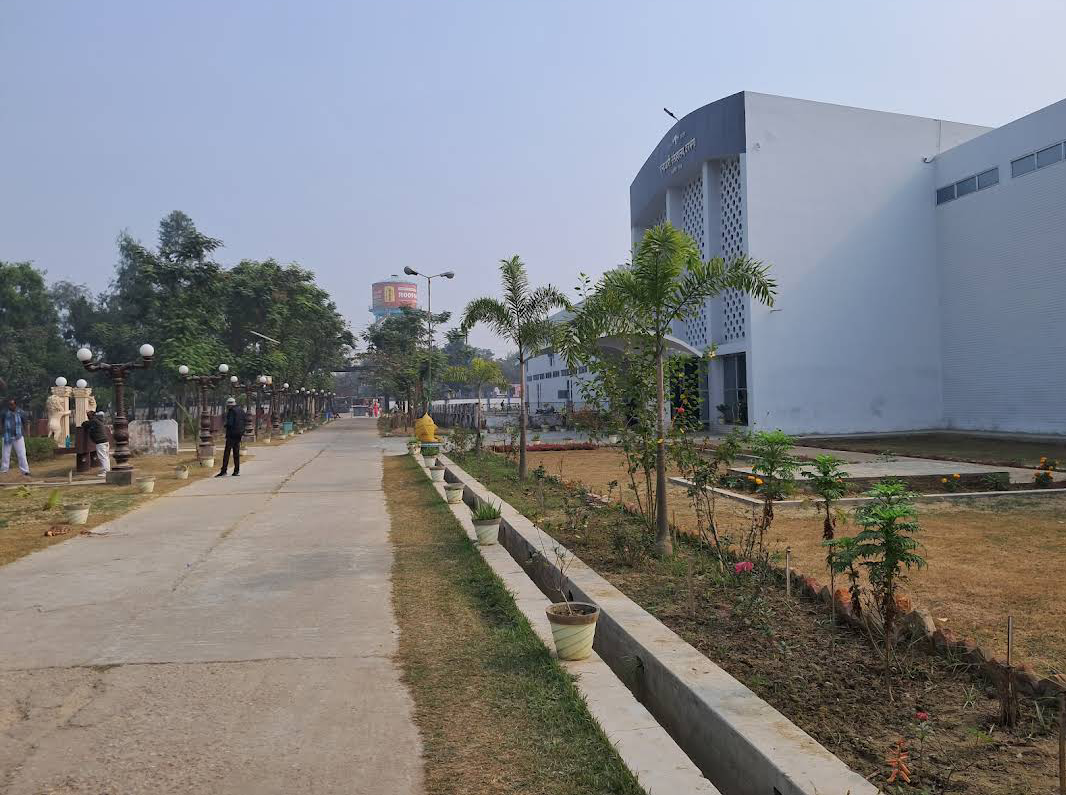
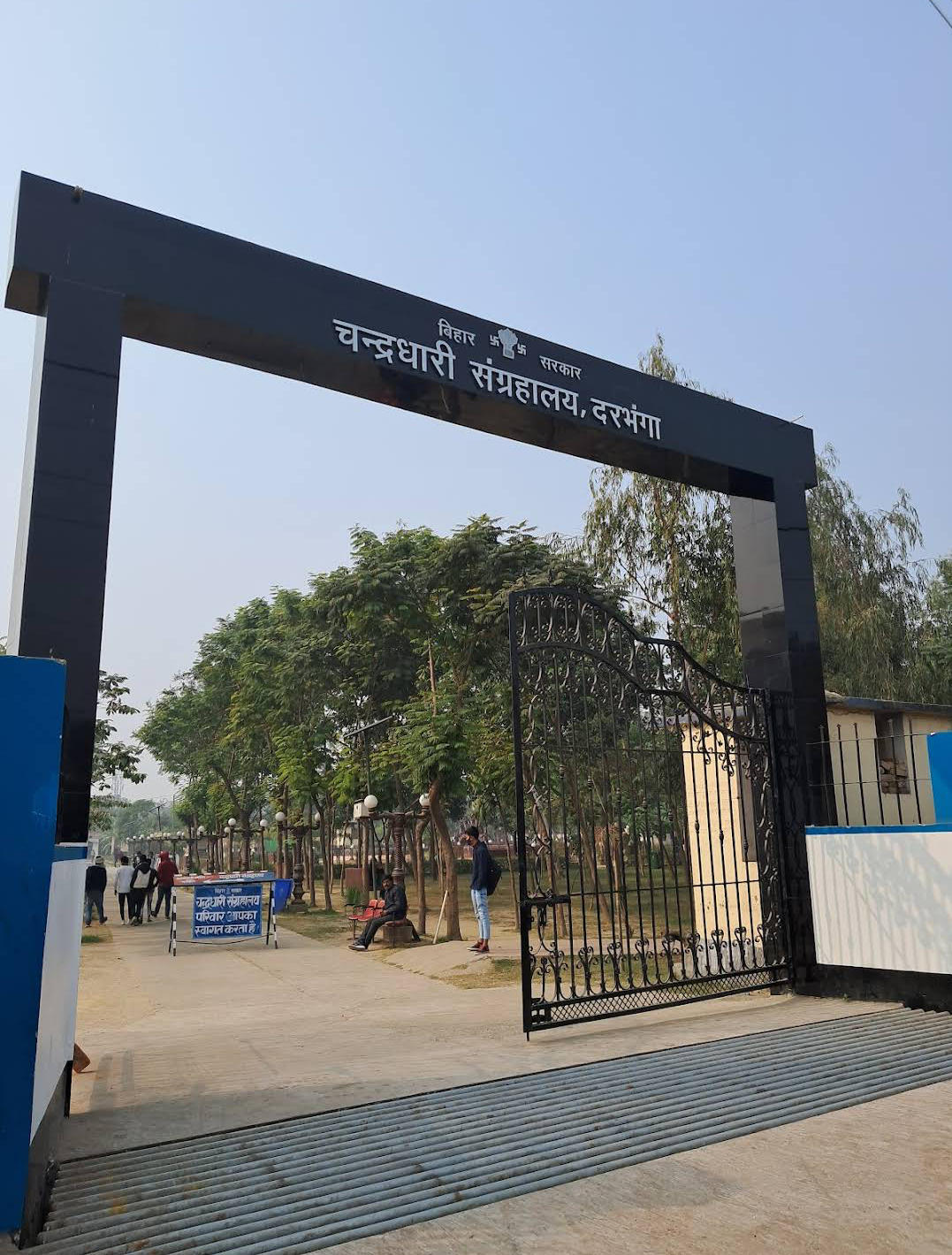
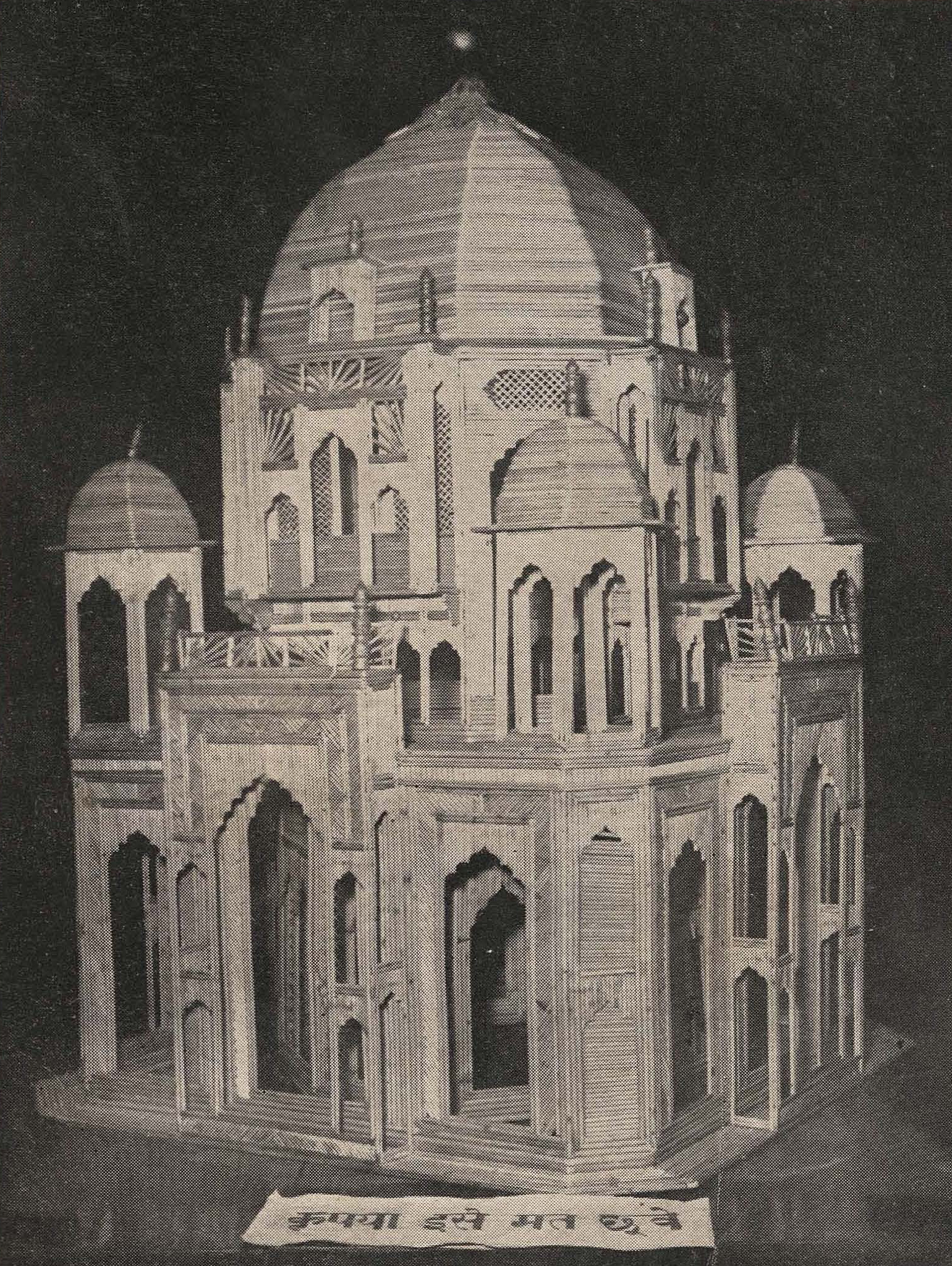
Chandradhari Museum
- Chandradhari Museum Chandradhari Museum (India)
- Established: 7 December 1957
- Location: Station Rd Darbhanga
- Coordinates: 26°9′7″N 85°54′23″E
- Type: Archaeological and artistic
- Curator: Sudhir Kumar Yadav

Chandradhari Museum which was established by the state government in 1957, It is situated at Darbhanga in Bihar, Originally situated on the eastern bank of Mansarowar Lake, The museum was shifted to the present double-storied building in 1974.

The Museum with the help of the private collection of Chandradhari Singh, a zamindar of Madhubani Chandradhari Museum was established on 7 December 1957 as Mithila Museum. It was later named after Babu Chandradhari Singh, the landlord of Ranti Dodhi of the main donor Madhubani district. It has been constructed from artifacts and heritage received from them.

== Exhibits ==
Chandradhari Museum Archaeological and artistic works are displayed in 11 gallery halls here. each exhibiting artifacts of a different category. Among the exhibit include attractive artifacts made of glass, rare and splendid artistic works of weavers, and rare miniature paintings of different styles. Most noteworthy among the paintings is the painting of Krishna Leela with Gopies, based on Geet-Govinda of Jaidev. Painting describing the great epic Ramayana has been arranged in this hall. The museum has a fabulous collection of statues made of Brass in Indian, Nepalese, and Tibetan style. Statues of Goddess Durga, Surya, and Lord Shiva are quite attractive. Statues related to Buddhism are also on display. The natural history section showcases costly gems and stones. The museum also has library facilities. There are art objects made of glass, fabric, metal, and other materials depicting epic stories, gems, battle guns, and other interesting subjects. Chandradhari lived in the nearby town of Madhubani and his family had donated his collections for this museum.

The museum is open from 10 to 4 o'clock for the general audience. At the moment, there is no fee. Many celebrities of the country have arrived in the museum. Maharaja Kameshwar Singh of Darbhanga has observed his heritage. Former Prime Minister Lal Bahadur Shastri, Indira Gandhi, former President Dr. Zakir Hussain, Loknayak Jayaprakash Narayan and his wife Pratishthi, former Chief Minister Dr. Srikrishna Co, Karpuri Thakur, former Governor Dr. AR Kidwai, Dr. LP Shahi, Jagannath Kaushal, Nitish kumar spent around two hours going through the 5,000 exhibits, etc. have examined

== See also ==
- Maharajadhiraj lakmeshwar singh museum Darbhanga
