= Sphoṭa =

How the mind orders linguistic units into coherent discourse and meaning

Sphoṭa (Sanskrit: स्फोट, IPA: [ˈspʰoːʈɐ]; "bursting, opening", "spurt") is an important concept in the Indian grammatical tradition of Vyakarana, relating to the problem of speech production, how the mind orders linguistic units into coherent discourse and meaning.

The theory of sphoṭa is associated with Bhartṛhari (c. 5th century), an early figure in Indic linguistic theory, mentioned in the 670s by Chinese traveller Yijing. Bhartṛhari is the author of the Vākyapadīya ("[treatise] on words and sentences"). The work is divided into three books, the Brahma-kāṇḍa, (or Āgama-samuccaya "aggregation of traditions"), the Vākya-kāṇḍa, and the Pada-kāṇḍa (or Prakīrṇaka "miscellaneous").

He theorized the act of speech as being made up of three stages:

1. Conceptualization by the speaker (Paśyantī "idea")
2. Performance of speaking (Madhyamā "medium")
3. Comprehension by the interpreter (Vaikharī "complete utterance").

Bhartṛhari is of the śabda-advaita "speech monistic" school which identifies language and cognition. According to George Cardona, "Vākyapadīya is considered to be the major Indian work of its time on grammar, semantics and philosophy."

== Etymology ==
While the sphoṭa theory proper (sphoṭavāda) originates with Bhartṛhari, the term has a longer history of use in the technical vocabulary of Sanskrit grammarians, and Bhartṛhari may have been building on the ideas of his predecessors, whose works are partly lost.

Sanskrit sphoṭa is etymologically derived from the root sphuṭ 'to burst'. It is used in its technical linguistic sense by Patañjali (2nd century BCE), in reference to the "bursting forth" of meaning or idea on the mind as language is uttered. Patañjali's sphoṭa is the invariant quality of speech. The acoustic element (dhvani) can be long or short, loud or soft, but the sphoṭa remains unaffected by individual speaker differences. Thus, a single phoneme (varṇa) such as /k/, /p/ or /a/ is an abstraction, distinct from variants produced in actual enunciation. Eternal qualities in language are already postulated by Yāska, in his Nirukta (1.1), where reference is made to another ancient grammarian, Audumbarāyaṇa, about whose work nothing is known, but who has been suggested as the original source of the concept. The grammarian Vyāḍi, author of the lost text Saṃgraha, may have developed some ideas in sphoṭa theory; in particular some distinctions relevant to dhvani are referred to by Bhartṛhari.

There is no use of sphoṭa as a technical term prior to Patañjali, but Pāṇini (6.1.123) refers to a grammarian named Sphoṭāyana as one of his predecessors. This has induced Pāṇini's medieval commentators (such as Haradatta) to ascribe the first development of the sphoṭavāda to Sphoṭāyana.

== Vākyapadīya ==
The account of the Chinese traveller Yijing places a firm terminus ante quem of AD 670 on Bhartṛhari. Scholarly opinion had formerly tended to place him in the 6th or 7th century; current consensus places him in the 5th century. By some traditional accounts, he is the same as the poet Bhartṛhari who wrote the Śatakatraya.

In the Vākyapadīya, the term sphoṭa takes on a finer nuance, but there is some dissension among scholars as to what Bhartṛhari intended to say. Sphoṭa retains its invariant attribute, but sometimes its indivisibility is emphasized and at other times it is said to operate at several levels. In verse I.93, Bhartṛhari states that the sphota is the universal or linguistic type—sentence-type or word-type, as opposed to their tokens (sounds).

Bhartṛhari develops this doctrine in a metaphysical setting, where he views sphoṭa as the language capability of man, revealing his consciousness. Indeed, the ultimate reality is also expressible in language, the śabda-brahman, or "Eternal Verbum". Early Indologists such as A. B. Keith felt that Bhartṛhari's sphoṭa was a mystical notion, owing to the metaphysical underpinning of Bhartṛhari's text, Vākyapādiya, where it is discussed. Also, the notion of "flash or insight" or "revelation" central to the concept also lent itself to this viewpoint. However, the modern view is that it is perhaps a more psychological distinction.

Bhartṛhari expands on the notion of sphoṭa in Patañjali, and discusses three levels:

1. varṇa-sphoṭa, at the syllable level. George Cardona feels that this remains an abstraction of sound, a further refinement on Patañjali for the concept of phoneme- now it stands for units of sound.
2. pada-sphoṭa, at the word level, and
3. vakya-sphoṭa, at the sentence level.

He makes a distinction between sphoṭa, which is whole and indivisible, and nāda, the sound, which is sequenced and therefore divisible. The sphoṭa is the causal root, the intention, behind an utterance, in which sense is similar to the notion of lemma in most psycholinguistic theories of speech production. However, sphoṭa arises also in the listener, which is different from the lemma position. Uttering the nāda induces the same mental state or sphoṭa in the listener - it comes as a whole, in a flash of recognition or intuition (pratibhā, 'shining forth'). This is particularly true for vakya-sphoṭa, where the entire sentence is thought of (by the speaker), and grasped (by the listener) as a whole.

Bimal K. Matilal (1990) has tried to unify these views - he feels that for Bhartṛhari the very process of thinking involves vibrations, so that thought has some sound-like properties. Thought operates by śabdana or 'speaking', - so that the mechanisms of thought are the same as that of language. Indeed, Bhartṛhari seems to be saying that thought is not possible without language. This leads to a somewhat whorfian position on the relationship between language and thought. The sphoṭa then is the carrier of this thought, as a primordial vibration.

Sometimes the nāda-sphoṭa distinction is posited in terms of the signifier-signified mapping, but this is a misconception. In traditional Sanskrit linguistic discourse (e.g. in Katyāyana), vācaka refers to the signifier, and 'vācya' the signified. The 'vācaka-vācya' relation is eternal for Katyāyana and the Mīmāṃsakas, but is conventional among the Nyāya. However, in Bhartṛhari, this duality is given up in favour of a more holistic view - for him, there is no independent meaning or signified; the meaning is inherent in the word or the sphoṭa itself.

== Editions of the Vākyapadīya ==
- K. Raghavan Pillai (trans.), Bhartrihari. The Vâkyapadîya, Critical texts of Cantos I and II with English Translation Delhi: Motilal Banarsidass, 1971.
- Wilhelm Rau, Bhartṛharis Vākyapadīya / die mūlakārikās nach den Handschriften hrsg. und mit einem pāda-Index versehen, Wiesbaden : Steiner, 1977, Abhandlungen für die Kunde des Morgenlandes 42,4
- Wilhelm Rau, Bhartṛharis Vākyapadīya II : Text der Palmblatt-Handschrift Trivandrum S.N. 532 (= A), Stuttgart : Steiner, 1991, Abhandlungen der Geistes- und Sozialwissenschaftlichen Klasse, Akademie der Wissenschaften und der Literatur Nr. 7, ISBN 3-515-06001-4
- Saroja Bhate, Word index to the Vākyapadīya of Bhartr̥hari, together with the complete text of the Vākyapadīya (Delhi: Eastern Book Linkers, 1992.) ISBN 81-85133-54-9 Open Library

== Reception ==
=== Vyākaraṇa ===
Sphoṭa theory remained widely influential in Indian philosophy of language and was the focus of much debate over several centuries. It was adopted by most scholars of Vyākaraṇa (grammar), but both the Mīmāṃsā and Nyāya schools rejected it, primarily on the grounds of compositionality. Adherents of the 'sphota' doctrine were holistic or non-compositional (a-khanḍa-pakṣa), suggesting that many larger units of language are understood as a whole, whereas the Mīmāṃsakas in particular proposed compositionality (khanḍa-pakṣa). According to the former, word meanings, if any, are arrived at after analyzing the sentences in which they occur. This debate had many of the features animating present day debates in language over semantic holism, for example.

The Mīmāṃsakas felt that the sound-units or the letters alone make up the word. The sound-units are uttered in sequence, but each leaves behind an impression, and the meaning is grasped only when the last unit is uttered. The position was most ably stated by Kumarila Bhatta (7th century) who argued that the 'sphoṭas' at the word and sentence level are after all composed of the smaller units, and cannot be different from their combination. However, in the end it is cognized as a whole, and this leads to the misperception of the sphoṭa as a single indivisible unit. Each sound unit in the utterance is an eternal, and the actual sounds differ owing to differences in manifestation.

The Nyāya view is enunciated among others by Jayanta (9th century), who argues against the Mīmāṃsā position by saying that the sound units as uttered are different; e.g. for the sound [g], we infer its 'g-hood' based on its similarity to other such sounds, and not because of any underlying eternal. Also, the vācaka-vācya linkage is viewed as arbitrary and conventional, and not eternal. However, he agrees with Kumarila in terms of the compositionality of an utterance.

Throughout the second millennium, a number of treatises discussed the sphoṭa doctrine. Particularly notable is Nageśabhaṭṭa's Sphotavāda (18th century). Nageśa clearly defines sphoṭa as a carrier of meaning, and identifies eight levels, some of which are divisible.

=== Modern linguistics ===
In modern times, scholars of Bhartṛhari have included Ferdinand de Saussure, who did his doctoral work on the genitive in Sanskrit and lectured on Sanskrit and Indo-European languages at the Paris and at the University of Geneva for nearly three decades. It is thought that he might have been influenced by some ideas of Bhartṛhari, particularly the sphoṭa debate. In particular, his description of the sign, as composed of the signifier and the signified, where these entities are not separable—the whole mapping from sound to denotation constitutes the sign—seems to have some colourings of sphoṭa in it. Many other prominent European scholars around 1900, including linguists such as Leonard Bloomfield and Roman Jakobson, were influenced by Bhartṛhari.

== Bibliography ==
- Saroja Bhate, Johannes Bronkhorst (eds.), Bhartṛhari - philosopher and grammarian : proceedings of the First International Conference on Bhartṛhari, University of Poona, January 6–8, 1992, Motilal Banarsidass Publishers, 1997, ISBN 81-208-1198-4
- Maria Piera Candotti, Interprétations du discours métalinguistique : la fortune du sūtra A 1 1 68 chez Patañjali et Bhartṛhari, Kykéion studi e testi. 1, Scienze delle religioni, Firenze University Press, 2006, Diss. Univ. Lausanne, 2004, ISBN 978-88-8453-452-1
- E. H. Clear, 'Hindu philosophy', in E. Craig (ed.), Routledge Encyclopedia of Philosophy, London: Routledge (1998)
- Harold Coward, The Sphota Theory of Language: A Philosophical Analysis, Delhi: Motilal Banarsidass, 1980.
- Alessandro Graheli, Teoria dello Sphoṭa nel sesto Ahnikā della Nyāyamañjarī di Jayantabhaṭṭa (2003), University "La Sapienza" thesis, Rome (2003).
- Alessandro Graheli, History and Transmission of the Nyāyamañjarī. Critical Edition of the Section on the Sphoṭa, Wien: Akademie Verlag, 2015.
- Radhika Herzberger, Bhartrihari and the Buddhists, Dordrecht: D. Reidel/Kluwer Academic Publishers, 1986.
- Jan E.M. Houben, The Sambanda Samuddesha and Bhartrihari's Philosophy of Language, Groningen: Egbert Forsten, 1995.
- Subramania K.A. Iyer, Bhartrihari. A Study of Vâkyapadîya in the Light of Ancient Commentaries, Poona: Deccan College Postgraduate Research Institute, 1969, reprint 1997.
- Tandra Patnaik, Śabda : a study of Bhartrhari's philosophy of language, New Delhi : DK Printworld, 1994, ISBN 81-246-0028-7.
- K. J. Shah, "Bhartrihari and Wittgenstein" in Perspectives on the Philosophy of Meaning (Vol. I, No. 1. New Delhi.)1/1 (1990): 80-95.

== See also ==
- Nyāya
- Śábda
- Vāc
