= Kamaladitya Sthan =

Archaeological sites in Mithila

- कमलादित्य स्थान (Maithili)
- Type: Archaeological site
- Location: Andhra village, Andhra Tharhi block
- Region: India, Mithila region

History
- Founded: Karnat Dynasty
- Built: Prime minister Shridhar of the Tirhut Sarkar
- Built for: King Nanyadeva

Kamaladitya Sthan (Maithili: कमलादित्य स्थान) is an ancient archaeological site in the Mithila region of the Indian subcontinent. It is the place where the ancient Kamlark Surya Mandir is located. It is also known as Kamaladitya Surya Mandir. It is located at the Andhra village in the Andhra Tharhi block of the Madhubani district in the state of Bihar in India. In the campus of the Kamaladitya Sthan, several ancient statues of Lord Vishnu have been excavated in different times. According to the historical evidence, there was approximately 22 acres of land in the name of Kamaladitya Sthan. But later due to encroachment and purchase of the lands by some people, Kamaladitya Sthan has now shrunk to a few Katthas of land.

== History ==
Kamaladitya Sthan is also a historical heritage of the Mithila region. It is said that the first King Nanyadeva of the Karnat Dynasty and his prime minister Shridhar, built a fort at this place. The archaeological remains and antiquities found here were kept into the Vachaspati Sangrahālaya in the village.

== Kamlark Surya Mandir ==
According to historians, Kamaladitya Sthan is considered as the place of Kamlark Surya Mandir and the idol installed in it is Surya Murti. According to legend, it is believed that during the period of Mahabharata, Lord Krishna's son Shambha had come here to worship at the Kamlark Surya Mandir to get rid from the curse of the celestial sage Devashree Narada.

Kamlark Surya Mandir
- कमलार्क सूर्य मंदिर

Religion
- Affiliation: Hinduism
- Deity: Lord Suryanarayana

Architecture
- Founder: Lord Krishna's son Shambha
- Inscriptions: Tirhuta scripts

During the excavation of the old temple, a samadhi of a Yogi named Magardhwaj was found under it. The name of the Yogi is inscribed on the stone slab above the Samadhi.
