= Vachaspati Nath Mahadev Mandir =

Ancient Shiva temple in Mithila

- वाचस्पति नाथ महादेव मंदिर

Religion
- Affiliation: Hinduism
- District: Madhubani district
- Deity: Lord Shiva

Location
- Location: Thadi Bishanpur village, Mithila region
- State: Bihar
- Country: India

Vachaspati Nath Mahadev Mandir (Maithili: वाचस्पति नाथ महादेव मंदिर) is an ancient temple dedicated to Lord Shiva in the Mithila region of the Indian subcontinent. It is located at Belwa Mahad in the Thadi Bishanpur village of the Madhubani district in the state of Bihar in India.
