= Edward Salim Michael =

Edward Salim Michael (1921 – November 2006) was a composer of symphonic music and an author of books on spirituality and meditation. It was to Buddhism that he felt closest, but as his teaching was based on his direct experience, he did not hesitate to quote Christian, Hindu, or Sufi mystics.

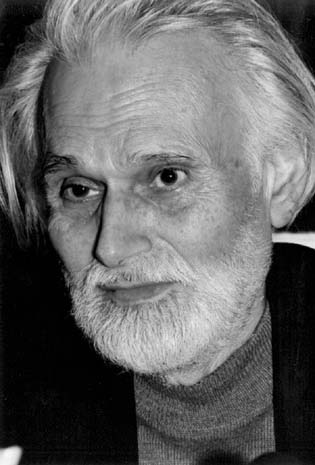

== Biography ==
Edward Salim Michael was born in Manchester, England, but spent his childhood in Iraq, which was then under British rule. He experienced poverty and insecurity. He was approximately twelve years old when his parents left Baghdad for Syria, which was under French rule, then for Egypt and for Palestine, which was not yet Israel and still at that time under British rule. His family returned to London just before World War II. As a British subject, he was enrolled into the Royal Air Force as an airman on the ground, which is how he spent the entire war. Michael was just nineteen years old when he enlisted. He had never been to school, could not read or write and barely spoke English. The Anglican chaplain from his camp took an interest in him and taught him to read and write. The chaplain's wife, a violist in a string quartet, was surprised at Michael's ability to memorise music. She decided to teach him the basics of composition, which he assimilated quickly. Two years later, his first orchestral work, a scherzo for orchestra ("The Dionysia"), won a competition in London, where it was performed at the Royal Albert Hall by the London Philharmonic Orchestra conducted by John Hollingsworth.

After the war, he pursued his musical studies at the Guildhall School of Music and Drama in London where he worked with Berthold Goldschmidt (student of Hindemith), then with Mátyás Seiber (student of Zoltán Kodály) and also studied the violin with Max Rostal. In 1947, he won a first prize in orchestra conducting and started a career as a solo violinist.

He gave numerous concerts in which he performed the thirty-five or so concertos that he had in his repertory as well as some fifty sonatas and more than two hundred other pieces for violin before leaving for Paris in 1950 to study with Nadia Boulanger.

Because of painful health problems he soon had to abandon the violin and conducting. From then onward, he devoted himself solely to composition.

In 1949 for the first time in his life he saw a statue of Buddha. He remained petrified in front of it and, when he returned to his home, he immediately put himself in the same posture as the statue. Closing his eyes, he began to focus on an internal sound that he heard within the ears and the head, without even knowing that what he was doing was meditation and that the sound on which he focused was known in India as the nada, a form of concentration known to both Hindus and Buddhists.

Alongside Michael's career as a musician, he undertook with passion a spiritual practice. Thanks to the exceptional ability to concentrate that he had developed as a composer, he began to have rapidly profound spiritual experiences.

At this time in his life, he was living in Paris in extremely precarious conditions. After four years of a most intense spiritual practice, he had, at the age of thirty-three, an experience of awakening to what one may call his "Buddha Nature" as well as the Infinite in oneself.

Michael continued to compose and struggle on a daily basis for his musical works to be played. He composed many orchestral pieces, among them a mass for mixed choir, two string orchestras, celesta, harp, glockenspiel and percussion. In 1954, he won the Vercelli prize for a psalm for a male choir. Two years later, his mass was performed by the orchestra of Radio France directed by Eugène Bigot. The next year, his Nocturne for flute and orchestra won the Lili Boulanger prize in the United States, given by a jury which included Igor Stravinsky and Aaron Copland.

As his music (that he signed with his first name Edward) remained tonal, it was becoming increasingly difficult to have it performed. He finally decided to give up composing and travelled to India, the country of his maternal grandmother, to dedicate himself fully to his inner life. He spent nearly seven years there, continuing the same practice of intense concentration and meditation.

He returned to France in 1974, and began to teach hatha yoga, which he had practiced intensively for years. Soon, his students were more interested in his spiritual teaching than in hatha yoga. At their request, he began writing his first book, written in English, The Way of Inner Vigilance, published in London in 1983, which he signed with his middle name Salim. Seven other books written directly in French followed before he departed from this world.

He also published with his wife Michele Michael a translation in French, from English, of the famous Buddhist text, the Dhammapada. He died in Nice, France.

== Music ==
Michael always wanted to remain tonal. His music shows a deep understanding of the laws of harmony with richness and depth in the orchestration. It features remarkably eastern ranges in western music, featuring flexibility, colour and new expression. Mystery and poetry plus a dramatic expression defines his inspiration that is often philosophical, even mystical.

== Teachings ==
Michael addressed his teaching to the seeker or the aspirant who is, as he said, "someone who has embarked on a spiritual path to try to find his True Identity, a state of Vast Consciousness, already present in him, but obscured by his ordinary mind and the clouds of his incessant thoughts. It is a man or a woman who struggles for enlightenment and his emancipation. "

== Main musical works ==
=== For orchestral strings ===
- Mass for mixed chorus, two string orchestras, Celestat, harp, glockenspiel and percussion. 36' (E. Ricordi)
- Initiation 18'30 (E. Choudens)
- Les Soirées de Tedjlah (Tedjlah's Evenings) for mezzo-soprano, (vocalist) two flutes, piano and string orchestra (Vercelli Price). 20' (E. Transatlantique)

=== For symphonic orchestra ===
- Nocturne for flute solo (or Ondes Martenot) and orchestra (Lili Boulanger Prize). 6'30 (E. Transatlantique)
- Fata Morgana, symphonic poem for orchestra. 8'30 (E. Ricordi)
- Le jardin de Tinajatama (Tinajatama’s garden) for orchestra. 10' (E. Ricordi)
- Elegy for orchestra 5'30 (E. Ricordi)
- Le festin des Dieux (The Feast of the Gods) for orchestra. 6' (E. Choudens)
- Trois Tableaux (Three pictures) for orchestra. 11'30 (E. Transatlantique)
- Le rêve d'Himalec (Himalec’s Dream) for orchestra. 13' - 1946 (E. Transatlantique) 13 '
- Rapsody concertante for violin and orchestra. 14' (E. Choudens)
- Kamaal, magical tale for narrator and orchestra. 40' (E. Transatlantique)
- La Vision de Lamis Helacim (Lamis Helacim’s Vision) symphonic poem for large orchestra (E. Ricordi)
- La reine des pluies (The Queen of rain) choreographic poem for large orchestra. 8' (E. Choudens)

== Books ==
- The Way of Inner Vigilance (translated in French by Michele Michael), reprinted at the beginning of 2010 by Inner Tradition under the title The Law of Attention, Nada Yoga and the Way of inner Vigilance.
- The Supreme Quest (translated from French by Tania Donay), published by Creative Space-Amazon
- Inner Awakening and Practice of Nada Yoga (translated from French by Tania Donay), published by Creative Space-Amazon

His biography in French by Michele Michael has been translated into English as The Price of a Remarkable Destiny, published by Creative Space-Amazon

Other books written in French to be translated include:

- Les obstacles à l'Illumination et à la Libération (The Obstacles to Enlightenment and Liberation)
- Les Fruits du chemin de l'Éveil (the Fruits of the path of Enlightenment)
- S'eveiller, une question de vie ou de mort (To awaken, a matter of life or death)
- Dans le silence de l'Insondable (In the Silence of the Infathomable)
- Du fond des Brumes (From the depths of Mist; published posthumously)

== See also ==
- Ajahn Sumedho, influenced by Michael
- Nada yoga
