= Tattvabindu =

Original treatise of Vachaspati Mishra

- Author: Vachaspati Mishra
- Original title: तत्त्वबिंदु
- Language: Sanskrit
- Subject: Sanskrit Grammar
- Genre: Theory of Meaning
- Publication date: 9th-10th century CE
- Publication place: India

Tattvabindu ( Devanagari: तत्त्वबिंदु ) is an independent treatise of the Indian philosopher Vachaspati Mishra on Sanskrit grammar, which focuses on Mīmāṃsā theories of sentence meaning. In Tattvabindu Vachaspati Mishra developed the principles of hermeneutics, and discusses the "theory of meaning" for the Mimamsa school of Indian Philosophy. It is an influential work attempting to resolve some of the interpretive controversies over classical Sanskrit texts.

== Etymology ==
Tattvabindu is a composite Sanskrit word made of two Sanskrit words Tattva and Bindu. The literal meaning of Tattva is element which signifies here to the truth and Similarly Bindu means Drop. Hence the literal meaning of Tattvabindu is “Drop of Truth".

== Description ==
This is a short treatise which deals with the important question of what the internal ' cause ' really is in verbal perception. Vachaspati Mishra wrote his Tattvabindu with the aim of clarifying Abhihitanvayavada, after facing challenges against it from the perspective of other theories such as Sphota and especially Prabhakara's Anvitabhidhanavada. Thus, Vachaspati Mishra properly explains the effective cause of word perception and establishes Abhihitanvayavada.

He has analyzed every objection raised by the inquisitive interpreters and answered it from the point of view of interpretive consequentialism. As he has shown, the basic stance of the inquisitive expressionists is that words express their meaning as well as their interrelationship through expression. The original stance is rejected on the ground that words must be assumed to have two signifying powers, one to express their meaning and the other to express their reciprocal relation. This is an undesirable situation because it assumes more than what a power can produce. Therefore, the Abhidhanvadis explained by Vachaspati Mishra have accepted Abhidhan on the basis of the conditions of aspiration etc. in the case of Anvitartha (meaning of phrase).

In a sentence, the words first explain their meaning and then the inference is established through the conditions of expectation etc. and through that inference the specific meaning of the words is explained by the characteristic.

Vachaspati Mishra's contribution lies in the analysis of objections and the formulation of answers. The objections are from the point of view of the inquisitive implicators and the answers are from the point of view of the implicationalists. Ultimately, connotationism has been established as the most satisfactory theory among the theories postulated by various schools of thought regarding the effective cause for word perception.

== Five competing theories of linguistic meaning ==
Vachaspati Mishra in his work Tattvabindu examines five competing theories of linguistic meaning.

1. Sphoṭavāda ( Mandan Mishra's Theory of Sphota ) - The first view presented and refuted by Vachaspati Mishra is the Sphota theory of the grammarians, namely Bhartrhari and Mimansa of Mandana Mishra. It involves understanding the meaning of a word or sentence by perceiving the sphota or single composite sound, which is separate from the elements (sounds or letters) that make up the word or sentence.
2. Nyaya Theory (Saṃskāra ) - Naiyayikas believe that the knowledge of previous letters (akshara) and the impressions generated by the experiences of previous words and their meanings is the cause of knowledge of sentence meanings. When we hear the final transitive component it involves the mnemonic joining of the transitive components of a word or sentence.
3. Mīmāmsā theory ( Upavarsa and others ) - According to which our understanding of the meaning of a sentence lies in the mnemonics formed by the words.
4. Anvitābhidhānavāda ( Prabhakara Mimansa Theory ) - The view on which a sign is constituted by what it is associated with." On this view, sentence-meaning is derived from the meaning of its words, which is given entirely only by syntactic relations with other words - in some context. or does not require memory traces.
5. Abhihitānvayavāda ( Kumarila Bhatta Theory ) - The view on which the relation (anvaya) is formed is what is represented." On this view, the word-meaning is first represented as a whole (abhita) and then through individual word-meaning lakshana (nihitartha). are connected.

== Bibliography ==
- Tattva-Kaumudi (Sankhya) of Vachaspati Misra , English translation with the Sanskrit text by Ganganatha Jha. Central Secretariat Library. 1896.
- Tattva Bindu (Sanskrit) by Vachaspati Misra Gangadhara, 1892.
