= Vachaspati Mishra Dih =

Residence of the Indian philosopher Vachaspati Mishra

- वाचस्पति मिश्र डीह
- Interactive map of Vachaspati Mishra Dih

Monastery information
- Other name: Vachaspati Dih
- Dedication: Bhamati, Tattvabindu
- Celebration: Vachaspati Smriti Parva

People
- Founder: Vachaspati Mishra
- Important associated figures: Bhamati

Architecture
- Heritage designation: Ancient Mithila University

Site
- Location: Naiyayika Tol, Thadi village, Andhra Tharhi Block, Madhubani district, Mithila region, Bihar
- Country: India
- Coordinates: 26.3790003°N 86.3335688°E

Vachaspati Mishra Dih ( Maithili: वाचस्पति मिश्र डीह ) is a historical site, a Dih (archaelogical mound) at the birthplace of the Indian philosopher Vachaspati Mishra at Thadi village of Madhubani district in the Mithila region of Bihar, India.

== Background ==
Vachaspati Mishra was an Indian philosopher and commentator of the six schools of Indian Philosophy during 9th-10th century. His commentary is known as Bhamati. He wrote eight books including the world famous Bhamati commentary on Nyaya Vedanta, Sankhya, Yoga and Mimansa. His main treatise is Tattavabindu. He was born in Thadi village of Andhratharhi block in Madhubani district of the Mithila region in Bihar, India.

== Description ==
Shankaracharya Nischalananda Saraswati of Puri visited the birthplace of Vachaspati Mishra at Thadhi some years ago. He then inspired the villagers to build a monument here to keep the memory of Vachaspati Mishra alive. Due to his inspiration the villagers installed a statue of Pandit Vachaspati Mishra in the campus of the Vachaspati Mishra Dih. Similarly a library was established there. The library building was constructed in the year 2012. There is a pond called as Mishrayan Pokhair near the Dih. In 2019, the Department of Arts, Culture and Youth of Bihar Government had announced to celebrate two-day State Vachaspati Smriti Parva. The Brahmins of the village have a tradition of starting their children's letters with the soil of the ground at the Dih.

=== Story of his commentary 'Bhamati' ===
According to legend, it is said that he was married in his childhood. After completing his studies he came to home and asked permission with his mother to write commentary on the Indian philosophy. After that he became absorbed in writing the commentary and forgot his worldly life. After few years her mother become old, so she brought her daughter in law for her assistance. Few years later his mother died, then his wife took the responsibility of house. His wife remained absorbed in his service. It is said that Vachaspati Mishra was so absorbed in his literary works that he never noticed who was servicing him. Once after 30 years in an evening when oil of his study lamp ran out at the time completion of his works, then his wife quickly poured oil into the lamp and lit up for lighting. It is said that Vachaspati Mishra saw a woman standing in front of him, but could not recognize her.

Vachaspati Mishra asked to his wife,

"O Goddess, who are you?"

His wife replied with bowing her eyes

"O God, I am your wife is it?” “My name is Bhamati.”

It is said that Vachaspati Mishra became impressed by her sacrifice and service and he immediately picked up his pen and wrote his book named Bhamati.
