= Maharajadhiraja Lakshmishwar Singh Museum =

Museum in Bihar, India

Maharajadhiraj Lakmeshwar singh Museum
- Type: Art Museum
- Location: Darbhanga
- Established: 1979
- Owner: Government of Bihar
- Website: NA

The Maharajadhiraj Lakshmishwar Singh Museum is situated at Darbhanga in the Indian state of Bihar. It has the largest collection of ivory craft items in India.

== History ==
It was established by the Government of Bihar in 1979. Most of the objects and artefacts were donated by the Erstwhile Royal Family of Darbhanga Raj to the Government of Bihar.

== Exhibition ==
The exhibition has a collection of a number of objects and weapons made of gold, silver, and ivory. For example; Raj Singhasan Hall has the collection of the royal throne of Maharaja Rameshwar Singh made of gold and silver, and an ivory throne that was once used by the rulers of the Darbhanga Raj, a royal chair made of ivory and polished cushioning. There are also separate halls dedicated to rare weapons and wooden artefacts.

== See also ==
- Chandradhari Museum.
