= Padamañjari =

11th century commentary

The Padamañjari is an 11th-century commentary on the Kashikavritti, a commentary on Pāṇini. It is attributed to Haradatta, who is also the author of a commentary on the Apastamba Dharmasutra, the Gautama Dharmasutra and other texts.
