= Bhartṛhari =

Indian linguist, philosopher, and poet (around 5th century CE)

- भर्तृहरि
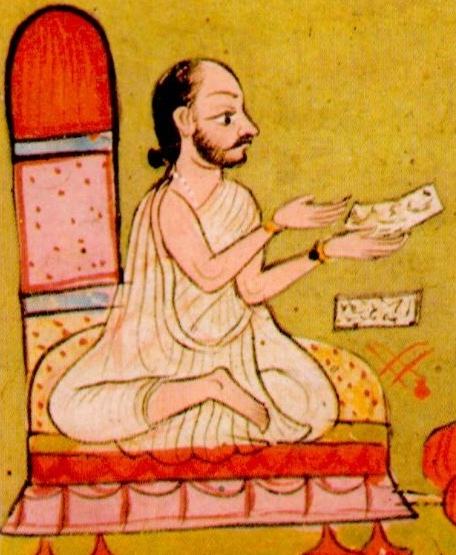
- Born: Ujjain

Philosophical work
- Era: 5th – 6th century CE
- Region: Madhya Pradesh, India
- Language: Sanskrit
- Main interests: Grammar, linguistics
- Notable works: Vākyapadīya
- Notable ideas: Sphota

Bhartṛhari (Devanagari: भर्तृहरि; Bhartrihari; fl. c. 5th to 6th century CE), was an Indian philosopher of language, linguist and poet, known for his contributions to the fields of linguistics, grammar, and philosophy. He is believed to have been born in the 5th century in Ujjain, Malwa, India. He decided to live a monastic life and find a higher meaning but was unable to detach from worldly life. He lived as a yogi in Ujjain until his death.

He is best known for his works, the Vākyapadīya (a treatise on sentences and words), Mahābhāṣyatikā (a commentary on Patanjali's Mahabhashya), Vākyapadīyavṛtti (a commentary on Vākyapadīya kāṇḍas 1 and 2), Śabdadhātusamīkṣā, and the 300-verse collection Śatakatraya.

Bhartrhari's philosophy is marked by the concept of "Shabda-Brahman", that the ultimate reality is expressed through words. He posited that language and cognition are linked and that by understanding grammar one can attain spiritual liberation.

Bhartrhari's works have been studied in various Indian philosophical traditions, including Vedanta and Mimamsa. Islamic and Western scholars^{(who?)} have also shown interest through various translations and commentaries. In the field of Indian poetics, Bhartrhari's Śatakatraya continues to be revered and studied and has been translated into many languages, affording access to a global audience.

== Life and background ==
Bhartrhari is believed to have been born in Ujjain, Malwa, India and lived in the 5th century. Details of his personal life are not known, but it is assumed, and accepted by scholars, that he lived between 485 and 540 CE. He was associated with the court of Valabhi (modern Vala, Gujarat) but decided to follow the path of Indian sages and renounced a sensual life to find higher meaning. He attempted to live a monastic life but was unable to successfully detach from worldly pleasures. After some time, he lived a life as a yogi in Ujjain till his death.

Siṃhasūrigaṇi, a 6th-century Jain writer, states that Bhartrhari studied under a grammarian named Vasurāta. Bhartrhari credits some of his theories to Vasurāta in his work the Vakyapadiya.

The Chinese traveller Yi-Jing (635-713 CE) mentions Bhartrhari in his travel notes. He claims that Bhartrhari was a Buddhist and wrote the works Vakyapadiya, Peina, and a commentary on Patanjali's Mahabhashya. Researchers have found some of the details given by Yi-Jing to be erroneous, specifically the time period that he was alive and that he was a Buddhist. Bhartrhari's philosophical position is widely held to be an offshoot of the Vyākaraṇa or grammarian school, closely allied to the realism of the Nyayas and distinctly opposed to Buddhist positions such as those of Dignaga, who was closer to phenomenalism.

== Philosophical contributions ==
Bhartrhari is known for his work in the philosophy of language, particularly his theories articulated in the Vākyapadīya ("Treatise on Sentences and Words"). This text is a comprehensive study of grammar and its metaphysical foundations. Bhartrhari's philosophy is marked by the concept of "Shabda-Brahman", which holds that the ultimate reality is expressed through words. He posited that language and cognition are linked and that by understanding grammar one can attain spiritual liberation.

In the Vākyapadīya, Bhartṛhari writes regarding svasamvedana, arguing that a cognition cannot be the content of another cognition. In verse 3.1.106 he explains why a cognition cannot be objectified using an example of light: "as a source of light is never illuminated by another one, likewise a cognition is never cognised by another one." He also writes that a cognition is always perceived at the same time of the cognition of its content. This explanation avoids infinite regress caused if a second order cognition was needed for the first cognition.

== Works ==
Bhartrhari is best known for his work in the philosophy of language. He wrote four books on grammar (vyākaraṇa): Vākyapadīya, Mahābhāṣyatikā (an early sub-commentary on Patanjali's Vyākaraṇa-Mahābhāṣya), Vākyapadīyavṛtti (commentary on Vākyapadīya kāṇḍas 1 and 2), and Śabdadhātusamīkṣā. As a poet, he also wrote the Śatakatraya, or Śataka, a three-part collection of 300 verses. According to Bhartrhari, a grammarian should deal with a language used in lokavyavahāra, meaning '(social) activities of the people’.

=== Vākyapadīya ===
The Vākyapadīya, also known as Trikāṇḍī (three books), is an Indian linguistic treatise on the philosophy of language, grammar, and semantics. It is divided into 3 main sections (or kāṇḍa): Brahma-kāṇḍa (Book of Brahman), Vākya-kāṇḍa (Book of Sentences), and Pada-kāṇḍa (Book of Words), and contains about 635 verses. The Brahma-kāṇḍa treats the metaphysical aspects of language. The Vākya-kāṇḍa deals with sentence structure and the relationship between its components. The Pada-kāṇḍa focuses on the meaning of words, phonetics, morphology, and semantics.

Bhartrhari's philosophy is centred around the concept of "sphoṭa". He believed that sphoṭa carries the meaning of the word(s) and is revealed to the listener upon hearing the word(s). Unlike Patanjali, Bhatrihari applies the term sphoṭa to each element of the utterance, varṇa (varṇasphoṭa; the letter or syllable), pada (padasphoṭa; the word), and vākya (vākyasphoṭa; the sentence).

=== Mahābhāṣyatikā ===
The Mahābhāṣyatikā, also known as Tripadi or Mahabhashyadipika, is a commentary on Patanjali's Mahabhashya, which itself is a commentary on Pāṇini's Aṣṭādhyāyī. Bhartrhari analyses grammatical rules and explores the metaphysical and epistemological aspects of language. Within this text, Bhartrhari also discusses the connection between words and their meanings, which is further elaborated in the Vākyapadīya. This text is studied by Sanskrit grammarians and philosophers.

=== Śatakatraya ===
The Śatakatraya ("Three Centuries": śataka, "century"; traya, "three") consists of three collections of 100 verses each. The collections are Niti Śataka (Ethics, which details principles of righteous living), Śringara Śataka (Love, which details the complexities of love and relationships), and Vairagya Śataka (Detachment, a reflection of Bhartrhari's renunciation). The date of composition is unknown but it is believed to have been written over the course of Bhartrhari's life. Bhartrhari uses various poetic devices including metaphors, similes, and paradoxes to convey complex ideas.

== Influence and legacy ==
Bhartrhari's works have been studied in various Indian philosophical traditions, including Vedanta and Mimamsa. Islamic and Western scholars have also shown interest through various translations and commentaries.

In the field of Indian poetics, Bhartrhari's Śatakatraya continues to be revered and studied. The Śatakatraya has been translated into many languages, affording access to a global audience. According to Mangat Bhardwaj, a modern linguist who has a similar approach to Bhartrhari's is Daniel Everett (2013).
