= Nāda yoga =

Ancient Indian metaphysical system

Nāda yoga (नादयोग) is an ancient Indian metaphysical system, a medicine, and a form of yoga. It is based on the premise that the entire cosmos and all that exists therin, including humans, are made up of vibrations, called nāda. This concept holds that it is the energy of vibrations, which make the particles of matter, and form the building blocks of the cosmos.

The vibrations are classified into two types, silent vibrations of the self (anahata), and sound [and] music (ahata), both of which carry a spiritual weight more meaningful, respectively, than what sensory properties normally provide. They are considered to play a potential medium/intermediary role to achieve a deeper unity with both the outer and inner cosmos.

Nāda yoga's use of vibrations and resonances are also used to pursue palliative effects on various problematic psychological and spiritual conditions. It is also employed to raise the level of awareness of the postulated energy centers called chakra.

Music has been used by some Indian saints as an important and powerful tool in the quest for nirvana; notably Kanakadasa, Thyagaraja, Kabir, Meerabai, Namdeo, Purandaradasa and Tukaram.

== Description ==
The Nāda yoga system divides music into two categories: silent vibrations of the self (internal music), anahata, and external music, ahata. While the external music is conveyed to consciousness via sensory organs in the form of the ears, in which mechanical energy is converted to electrochemical energy and then transformed in the brain to sensations of sound, it is the anahata chakra, which is considered responsible for the reception of the internal music, but not in the way of a normal sensory organ.

The anahata concept refers to silent vibrations of the self, which are thought to be so closely associated with one's self and the Self that a person can not share their anahata with another human being. In other words, this inner sound, silent vibration of the self, is sacred and once reached will open the practitioner's chakras, which ultimately will unite the body to the divine/cosmos.

With continued sounds and a focus on silent vibrations of the self and controlled breath, the individual can, according to Nāda yoga, "listen in on" their own anahata, their own "inner sound", which can take up to nine different forms. Such a process of inner awareness and sensitivity leads to increased self-recollectedness and finally to awakening.

To concentrate on this inner sound (silent vibration of the self) as a support for meditation is very helpful to tame the mind, and when it has been clearly recognized, used for self-recollectedness in outer life as well. Eventually, it can be experienced as penetrating all matter and indeed vibrates eternally throughout the Creation.

In Nāda yoga, one of the main breathing sounds is ahaṃ (literally "I," referring to the inner essence, not ego), where each part of the word (a ha ṃ) is focused on and spoken individually. The echoes produced by each of these spoken letters is a time where the yogi should immerse themself and rest. Now, because of imbalances within the human body, Nāda yoga begins by removing the ailments and impurities by "awakening the fire in the body (jāṭhara)" (Timalsina 212) with the use of a sound resembling that of a bee. When the yogi/yogini is forming sounds, their mind should not wander off to other entities.

One group to incorporate yoga, Nāda yoga specifically, and the practice of sound into the spiritual transformation is the Josmanĩ. The Josmanĩ are identified as a Sant tradition, and they are a blend of Śrī Vaiṣṇava Bhakti tradition with the Nāth Yoga tradition. Yoga is used in "personal and social transformation" (Timalsina 202). The Josmani's spiritual quest interlinks the practice of Kuṇḍali and Nāda Yoga.

In the West, detailed indications and advice have been given by Edward Salim Michael in his book The Law of attention, Nada Yoga and the way of inner vigilance. Ajahn Sumedho, from the Thai Forest Tradition teaches the practice of this inner sound.

The condition known in western medicine as tinnitus is considered in Ayurvedic medicine to possibly be caused by spiritual awakening to the anahata.

== Primary literature ==
Nada Bindu Upanishad

Shurangama Sutra

The Śūraṅgama Sūtra, often spelled Shurangama Sutra or Surangama Sutra in English, is a Mahayana sutra and one of the main texts used in the Chán school in Chinese Buddhism. In the Surangama Sutra, Avalokitesvara says that he attained enlightenment through concentration on the subtle inner sound. The Buddha then praises Avalokitesvara and says that this is the supreme way to go.

"How sweetly mysterious is the Transcendental Sound of Avalokiteshvara! It is the pure Brahman Sound. It is the subdued murmur of the seatide setting inward. Its mysterious Sound brings liberation and peace to all sentient beings who in their distress are calling for aid; it brings a sense of permanency to those who are truly seeking the attainment of Nirvana's Peace . . ."

"All the Brothers in this Great Assembly, and you too, Ananda, should reverse your outward perception of hearing and listen inwardly for the perfectly unified and intrinsic sound of your own Mind-Essence, for as soon as you have attained perfect accommodation, you will have attained to Supreme Enlightenment."

== Secondary literature ==
=== Mantrayana ===
1. Jamgon Kongtrul (1813–1899) provides an important paradigm of salience for the esoteric Dzogchen doctrine of "sound, light and rays" (Wylie: sgra 'od zer gsum) and the 'mantra' of the Mantrayana tradition in particular, Kongtrul, et al. (2005: p. 431) identifies the “primordial sound” (nāda) and its semantic field:

The primordial indestructible great vital essence (gdod ma'i mi shigs pa'i thig le chen po), which is the root or ground of all of cyclic life [samsara] and perfect peace [nirvana], is known as primordial (gdod ma) because it has no beginning or end; as indestructible (mi shigs pa) because it is indivisible; as vital essence (thig le) because it pervades the various appearances; and as great (chen po) because there is nothing that it does not encompass. There are countless synonyms for the primordial indestructible great vital essence, such as "great seal" (phyag rgya chen po, mahāmudrā), "great bliss" (bde ba chen po, mahāsukha), "primordial sound" (nāda), "all-pervading vajra of space" (mkha' khyab nam mkha'i rdo rje), "ordinary awareness" (tha mal shes pa), "pristine awareness channel" (ye shes kyi rtsa), "pristine awareness wind" (ye she kyi rlung), "invincible ham" (gzhom med kyi ham), "invincible vital essence" (gzhom med kyi thig le), "essence of enlightenment" (sugatagarbha), and "transcendent wisdom" (she rab phar phyin, prajnā-pāramitā) (CPR, f. 29a3-b2).

This quotation comes from the famed Sheja Dzö or 'The Treasury of Knowledge' (Tibetan: ཤེས་བྱ་མཛོད, Wylie: shes bya mdzod) a voluminous work, encyclopedic in breadth, by Jamgon Kongtrul.

2. The Mahasiddha Vinapa (The Musician) achieved mahamudra through contemplation of the unborn, unstruck sound:

With perseverance and devotion

I mastered the vina's errant chords;
but then practicing the unborn, unstruck sound
I, Vinapa, lost my self.

...his mastery of the "unborn, unstruck sound" made audible by eradication of concepts, judgements, comparisons and criticism that obscure cognition of the pure sound of the instrument, is accomplishment of the fulfilment process. The unstruck sound is the sound of silence and is the auditory equivalent of phenomenal emptiness. It is absolute sound; it is the potential sound of everything composed and waiting to be composed. Lost in this non-sound, the sense of self becomes infinitely diffused in emptiness.

These quotes are from p. 91 and p. 93 respectively of "Masters of Mahamudra: Songs and Histories of the Eighty-four Buddhist Siddhas" by Keith Dowman, Publisher: State University of New York Press (ISBN 978-0-88706-160-8)

== See also ==
- Pranava
- Logos
- Shabda
- Kirtan
- Aether theories
