= Andhra Tharhi =

Village in India

Coordinates: 26°23′N 86°20′E

Andhratharhi Andharathadhi
- Semi urban village
- Andhra Tharhi
- Interactive map of Andhratharhi
- Country: India
- State: Bihar
- Region: Mithila region
- District: Madhubani district

Population (2011)
  - Total: 23,959
- Demonym: Maithil

Language
  - Official: Hindi

Local language
  - Mother language: Maithili

Andhara Tharhi is a village cum block in the Madhubani District of the Mithila region in the Bihar state of India. It is a historical village and was capital of some kings in the region. It is the seat of the eponymous Vidhan Sabha constituency. Its name comes from Andhra Thora, or the King of Andhra stays here. Andhra and Thari are two separate villages. As Andhra became a market and commercial centre of the local area, it expanded and effectively merged with Thari. Hence the name Andhra Thari. The local and mother language of the village is Maithili. Similarly, Hindi is the official language.

== Geography ==
Andhra Tharhi is located 20 km from Jhanjharpur and approximately 35 km from Madhubani. The nearest railway station is Vachaspati Nagar railway station.

== Demographics ==
According to the population census 2011, the total population of the village is 23,959. The total number of households is 4,739.

== Historical significance ==
The region of the Andharathadhi block has been famous for being the capital of different kings in different eras. The antiquities found in the region of the block have been preserved at a museum known as Vachaspati Sangrahālaya in the village.

The village is the birthplace of the great Indian philosopher Vachaspati Mishra. Presently, his birthplace has been designated as a historical place known as Vachaspati Mishra Dih. It is a cultural and historical heritage of the entire Mithila region. Vachaspati Mishra was an eminent scholar and commentator of the Vedanta philosophy. His commentary on Vedanta is known as Bhamati which later became a subschool of thought in Vedanta. Every year in the campus of the dih, a memorial festival sponsored by the state government is organised.

In the village, there is an ancient temple of Lord Shiva known as Vachaspati Nath Mahadev Mandir at Belwa Mahad. Similarly, at Andhra village, there is an ancient archaeological site known as Kamaladitya Sthan.

== Education ==
Schools and colleges in Andhra Tharhi include:

- PDKJ College
- Naina Dutt College
- MRG High School
