= Ashok Aklujkar =

Indian academic

- Education: B.A., University of Poona M.A., University of Poona Ph.D., Harvard University D.Litt., Rashtriya Sanskrit Sansthan
- Occupations: Professor Emeritus, University of British Columbia

Ashok Aklujkar is a Sanskritist and Indologist. He is professor emeritus in the Department of Asian Studies at the University of British Columbia. There he taught courses in Sanskrit language and in the related mythological and philosophical literatures (occasionally also in Indian belles lettres in general) from 1969 to 2006. Advanced students have worked under his guidance in the areas of Buddhist and Hindu philosophy, religion, and mythology. His published research is mostly in the areas of Sanskrit linguistic tradition and poetics. He has been a visiting professor at Hamburg, Harvard, Rome, Kyoto, Paris, Oxford and Marburg. He is most well known as the author of the textbook Sanskrit: an Easy Introduction to an Enchanting Language, Richmond, BC: Svādhyāya Publications, most recent edition in 2005. He received an honorary D.Litt from the Rashtriya Sanskrit Sansthan, New Delhi in 2012.

== Biography ==
Ashok Aklujkar, the author of Sanskrit: an Easy Introduction to an Enchanting Language, received his M.A. degree in Sanskrit and Pali from the University of Poona and his Ph.D. degree in Sanskrit and Indian Studies from Harvard University. He taught courses in Sanskrit language and in the related mythological and philosophical literatures (occasionally also in Indian belles lettres in general) at the University of British Columbia between 1969 and 2001. His published research is mostly in the areas of Sanskrit linguistic tradition and poetics. For the last several years he is engaged in the ambitious project of preparing critical editions of the works of Bhartṛhari, a grammarian-philosopher, and of the commentaries elucidating those works. Advanced students have worked under Aklujkar's guidance in the areas of Buddhist and Brahmanical philosophy, religion, and mythology.

== Education ==
1. Sir Parashurambhau College, University of Poona, B.A., 1962.
2. University of Poona, M.A., 1964.
3. Harvard University, Ph.D., 1970.

== Service in professional and learned societies ==
1. Head of the Department of Asian Studies, 1980–1985
2. Creator of funds to enable extraordinary students to work as research or teaching assistants and to participate in learned society meetings.
3. Founder, Canadian Association of Sanskrit and Related Studies, Secretary-Treasurer and Newsletter editor for most years.
4. Member, Consultative Committee, International Association of Sanskrit Studies, 1978–present.
5. Sectional Chairman, South Asia, and member board of directors, American Oriental Society, 1980–85.
6. Member Board of Governors, Shastri Indo-Canadian Institute, 1985–90.

== Academic or professional awards and distinctions ==
1. American Council of Learned Societies Fellowship, 1973–74.
2. Alexander von Humboldt-Stiftung Fellowship, 1973–74 (declined), 78–79, 98–99, 2007.
3. Canada Council = later Social Sciences and Humanities Research Council of Canada, leave fellowships and research grants.
4. University of British Columbia, Senior Killam Fellowship, 1978–79, 1987–88.
5. "Hamburg (Humboldt Stiftung), Harvard (Infinity Foundation), Rome, Kyoto, Oxford (Shivadasani), Marburg (Mercator), and Pune (Khyentse Foundation)
6. Honoured as Vidyā-sāgara by Samskrta Mandakini Association, New Delhi at the 10th World Sanskrit Conference, 1997, and as Vyākaraṇa-prabhākara at the 18th International Congress of Vedanta, 2008.
7. World Sanskrit Award 2018, the Indian Council for Cultural Relations (ICCR), at Jawaharlal Nehru Bhawan in New Delhi on March 7, 2019.

== Professional service and experience ==
1. Speaker and producer on topics of Sanskritic interest, All India Radio, Poona/Pune, 1959–65, 1988, 1993.
2. Associate Editor of the Sanskrit periodical Śāradā, 1959–65.
3. Invited lectures at most institutions recognised as seats of Indological studies: Harvard, Oxford, Paris, Tuebingen, Heidelberg, Goettingen, Hamburg, Copenhagen, Rome, Kyoto, Tokyo, Seattle, Varanasi, Poona/Pune, Madras/Chennai, Mumbai, Tirupati, Baroda, etc.
4. Read papers frequently at the International Congress of Orientalists, Annual meetings of the American Oriental Society, World Sanskrit Conferences, International Congress of Vedanta, etc.

== Major publications ==
=== Books ===
- Appā-śāstrī sāhitya-samīkṣā, 1965; Sanskrit: an Easy Introduction to an Enchanting Language,1992, with many reprints;
- The Theory of Nipātas (Particles) in Yāska's Nirukta, 1999;
- Linguistic Traditions of Kashmir (with Mrinal Kaul), 2008.

=== Research articles ===
More than 90 research articles and 19 long reviews in The Journal of the American Oriental Society, Wiener Zeitschrift der Kunde Suedasiens, Indo-Iranian Journal, Annals of the Bhandarkar Oriental Research Institute, Adyar Library Bulletin, etc.

About 56 poems, light essays, editorials, etc. in Sanskrit and Marathi in Bhārata-vāṇī, Śāradā, Saṁskṛta-pratibhā, Ekatā etc. About 18 books, with 12 of them concerning Bhartr-hari, a grammarian-philosopher, within range of completion. Several articles that would ultimately change some of the paradigms of Indological research are in the press or will soon be sent for publication.
