= Pramanavarttika =

Buddhist text on epistemology

The Pramāṇavārttika (Brahmi: 𑀧𑁆𑀭𑀫𑀸𑀡𑀯𑀸𑀭𑁆𑀢𑁆𑀢𑀺𑀓, Commentary on Valid Cognition; Tib. tshad ma rnam 'grel) is an influential Buddhist text on pramana (valid instruments of knowledge, epistemic criteria), a form of Indian epistemology. The Pramāṇavārttika is the magnum opus of the Indian Buddhist Dharmakirti (floruit 6-7th centuries).

== Outline ==
The Pramanavarttika is written in about 2,000 verse stanzas. The four chapters deal, respectively, with inference for oneself (svarthanumana), valid knowledge (pramanasiddhi), sense perception (pratyaksa), and inference for others (pararthanumana). The work is a commentary on an earlier work by the Buddhist logician Dignaga, the Pramanasamuccaya.

=== Chapter 1 ===
The first chapter (the svarthanumana chapter) discusses the structure and types of formal inference and the apoha (exclusion) theory of meaning. Dan Arnold writes that apoha is: "the idea that concepts are more precise or determinate (more contentful) just to the extent that they exclude more from their purview; the scope of cat is narrower than that of mammal just insofar as the former additionally excludes from its range all mammals in the world that are not cats."

In the latter half of this chapter, Dharmakīrti also mounts an attack on Brahmanism, the authority of the Vedas, Brahmins and their use of mantras, and the system of caste (see Eltschinger 2000). Dharmakirti critiques the Vedic brahmins thus:

The unquestioned authority of the Vedas;
the belief in a world-creator;
the quest for purification through ritual bathing;
the arrogant division into castes;
the practice of mortification to atone for sin—
these five are the marks of the crass stupidity of witless men.

Dharmakīrti also discusses the role of scripture, which he sees as fallible and yet important for their discussion of “radically inaccessible things” (atyantaparokṣa) such as karma.

=== Chapter 2 ===
The second, pramanasiddhi chapter first seeks to defend the authority of the Buddha as a valid source of knowledge for those seeking spiritual freedom and to show that he spoke the truth. His defense focuses on the five epithets of the Buddha attributed to him by Dignaga: being a means of knowledge (pramanabhutatva), seeking the benefit of all living creatures, being a teacher, being 'well gone', and being a protector.

Dharmakirti uses the Buddha's infinite compassion (karuṇā) as a basis for the proof that he is a reliable source of knowledge, as he writes "compassion is the proof [of the Buddha being a means of knowledge]."

From the discussion on the Buddha's infinite compassion, Dharmakirti then goes on to attack the materialist theories of the Carvaka school and the soul theories of the Hindu Brahminical schools and provides a defense of the Buddhist concept of rebirth. According to Dan Arnold, Dharmakirti's argument here is that: "sentient phenomena must have among their causes events that are themselves sentient; events, more generally, must have ontologically homogeneous causes. The straightforward claim is thus that the events constituting the physical body are ontologically distinct from those that cause mental events." For Dharmakirti then, cognition is dependent not just on sense objects and physical sense organs, but on a previous event of awareness (manovijnana). This argument has been described by Dan Arnold as dualistic, a denial of the reducibility of mental events to physical events and to be an appeal to qualia even though Dharmakirti eventually goes on to defend a form of epistemic idealism (Yogacara).

=== Chapter 3 ===
In the third chapter, Dharmakirti argues that there are only two valid pramanas, perception (pratyaksa), which is the foundation, and inference (anumana), which is based on but not reducible to perception. These two pramanas have as their objects the only two kinds of things that exist, unique particulars (svalaksanas) and the abstract/universals (samanyalaksana). Svalaksana are the ultimately existing things, the only kind of thing that really exists. Since perception is seen as apprehending the real unique particulars, it is for Dharmakirti, "devoid of conception." Dan Arnold has argued that this is similar to a form of empiricism termed epistemological representationalism.

In this chapter Dharmakīrti also explains the perception of a yogin (yogipratyakṣa).

The final chapter discusses the ways in which logical reasons are correct or incorrect.

== Influence ==
The Pramanavarttika was very influential among Buddhist philosophers such as Jnanagarbha, Santaraksita and Kamalasila for whom it became a key work on epistemology. It was also influential among non-Buddhist thinkers like Akalanka and Adi Shankara.

In Tibetan Buddhism, it was influential among thinkers like Sakya Pandita and Tsongkhapa, and it is the major work on epistemology studied in Buddhist monasteries. According to Georges Dreyfus:

Since the time of Sa-pan. this work has been considered one of the most important texts in the Tibetan scholastic tradition. It not only covers important areas such as logic, philosophy of language, and epistemology; it also provides the philosophical methodology for scholastic studies generally, as well as a large part of the philosophical vocabulary and the tools (arguments and consequences) used in debate.

== Commentaries ==
Dharmakirti wrote a long auto-commentary on the first chapter. It is known as the Svopajñaṛtti, or Svavṛtti. Other commentaries include:

- Devendrabuddhi - Pramāṇavārttikapañjikā
- Prajñākaragupta - Pramāṇavārttikālaṅkāra
- Śākyabuddhi - Pramāṇavārttikaṭīkā
- Karṇakagomin - Pramāṇavārttikavṛttiṭīkā
- Manorathanandin - Pramāṇavārttikavṛtti
- Ravigupta - Raviguptaramāṇavārttikavṛtti
- Śaṅkaranandana - Pramāṇavārttikaṭīkā / Pramāṇavārttikānusāra
- Khedrup Je - Ocean of Reasoning
- Gyaltsab Je - Elucidation of the Path to Liberation
- Ju Mipham Rinpoche's commentary - tshad ma rnam 'grel gyi gzhung gsal bor bshad pa legs bshad snang ba'i gter

== See also ==
- Pramāṇa-samuccaya
- Buddhist philosophy
- Pramana
- Epistemology

== Bibliography ==
- Jackson, Roger R.; Is Enlightenment Possible?: Dharmakirti and Rgyal Tshab Rje on Knowledge, Rebirth, No-Self and Liberation, 1993
- Tilleman's, Tom JF; Dharmakirti's Pramanavarttika: An annotated Translation of the fourth chapter (parathanumana), Volum (Bilingual), 2000.
- Dunne, John D., 2004, Foundations of Dharmakīrti's Philosophy (Studies in Indian and Tibetan Buddhism), Cambridge MA: Wisdom Publications.
- Franco, Eli, 1997, Dharmakīrti on Compassion and Rebirth (Wiener Studien zur Tibetologie und Buddhismuskunde 38), Vienna: Arbeitskreis für Tibetische und Buddhistische Studien Universität Wien.
