= Dharmottara =

Indian Buddhist author

Dharmottara (Tibetan: chos mchog) was an 8th-century Indian Buddhist author of several important works on pramana (valid cognition, epistemology), including commentaries on the writings of Dharmakirti. Only one of his works survives in the original Sanskrit, the Nyāyabinduṭīkā, while others survive in Tibetan translation.

== Works ==
- Apoha-nāma-prakaraṇa (gzhan sel ba zhes bya ba'i rab tu byed pa)
- Kṣaṇabhaṅgasiddhi (skad cig ma 'jig pa grub pa)
- Nyāyabinduṭīkā (rigs pa'i thigs pa'i rgya cher 'grel pa)
- Paralokasiddhi ('jig rten pha rol grub pa)
- Pramāṇaparīkṣā (tshad ma brtag pa)
- Pramāṇaviniścayaṭīkā (tshad ma rnam par nges pa'i 'grel bshad)

== See also ==
- Buddhist logic
- Epistemology
