= Buddhist logico-epistemology =

Epistemological study of Buddhism

Translations of Buddhist logico-epistemology
- English: Buddhist logico-epistemology
- Sanskrit: hetuvidyā
- Chinese: 因明學
- Vietnamese: Nhân minh học Phật giáo

Buddhist logico-epistemology is a term used in Western scholarship to describe Buddhist systems of pramāṇa (epistemic tool, valid cognition) and hetu-vidya (reasoning, logic).

While the term may refer to various Buddhist systems and views on reasoning and epistemology, it is most often used to refer to the work of the "Epistemological school" (Sanskrit: Pramāṇa-vāda), i.e., the school of Dignaga and Dharmakirti which developed from the 5th through 7th centuries and remained the main system of Buddhist reasoning until the decline of Buddhism in India.

The early Buddhist texts show that the historical Buddha was familiar with certain rules of reasoning used for debating purposes and made use of these against his opponents. He also seems to have held certain ideas about epistemology and reasoning, though he did not put forth a logico-epistemological system.

The Theravada Kathāvatthu contains some rules on debate and reasoning. The first Buddhist thinker to discuss logical and epistemic issues systematically was Vasubandhu in his Vāda-vidhi (A Method for Argumentation). A mature system of Buddhist logic and epistemology was founded by the Buddhist scholar Dignāga (c. 480–540 CE) in his magnum opus, the Pramāṇa-samuccaya. Dharmakirti further developed this system with several innovations in his Pramanavarttika ("Commentary on Valid Cognition"). His work was influential on all later Buddhist philosophical systems as well as on numerous Hindu thinkers. It also became the main source of epistemology and reasoning in Tibetan Buddhism.

== Definition ==
Scholars such as H.N. Randle and Fyodor Shcherbatskoy (1930s) initially employed terms such as “Indian Logic” and “Buddhist Logic” to refer to the Indian tradition of inference (anumāna), epistemology (pramana), and "science of causes" (hetu-vidyā). This tradition developed in the orthodox Hindu tradition known as Nyaya as well as in Buddhist philosophy. Logic in classical India, writes Bimal Krishna Matilal, is "the systematic study of informal inference-patterns, the rules of debate, the identification of sound inference vis-à-vis sophistical argument, and similar topics." As Matilal notes, this tradition developed out of systematic debate theory (vadavidyā):

Logic as the study of the form of correct arguments and inference patterns, developed in India from the methodology of philosophical debate. The art of conducting a philosophical debate was prevalent probably as early as the time of the Buddha and the Mahavira (Jina), but it became more systematic and methodical a few hundred years later.

"Indian Logic" is a different system than modern derivatives of classical logic (such as modern predicate calculus): anumāna-theory, a system in its own right. "Indian Logic" was also influenced by the study of grammar, whereas Classical Logic—which principally informed modern Western Logic—was influenced by the study of mathematics.

A key difference between Western Logic and Indian Logic is that certain epistemological issues are included within Indian Logic, whereas in modern Western Logic they are deliberately excluded. Indian Logic includes general questions regarding the "nature of the derivation of knowledge," epistemology, from information supplied by evidence, evidence which in turn may be another item of knowledge. For this reason, other scholars use the term "logico-epistemology" to refer to this tradition, emphasizing the centrality of the epistemic project for Indian logical reasoning. According to Georges Dreyfus, while Western logic tends to be focused on formal validity and deduction:

The concern of Indian "logicians" is quite different. They intend to provide a critical and systematic analysis of the diverse means of correct cognition that we use practically in our quest for knowledge. In this task, they discuss the nature and types of pramana. Although Indian philosophers disagree on the types of cognition that can be considered valid, most recognize perception and inference as valid. Within this context, which is mostly epistemological and practically oriented, topics such as the nature and types of correct reasoning that pertain to logic in the large sense of the word are discussed.

=== Pramana ===
Pramāṇa (Tib. tshad ma) is often translated as "valid cognition" or "instrument of knowledge" and refers to epistemic ways of knowing. Epistemological justification distinguishes Buddhist pramana from orthodox Hindu philosophy. All schools of Indian logic recognize various sets of "valid justifications for knowledge" or pramana. Buddhist logico-epistemology was influenced by the Nyāya school's methodology, but where the Nyaya recognised a set of four pramanas—perception, inference, comparison, and testimony—the Buddhists (i.e. the school of Dignaga) only recognized two: perception and inference. For Dignaga, comparison and testimony are just special forms of inference.

Most Indic pramanavada accept "perception" (Sanskrit: pratyakṣa) and "inference" (Sanskrit: anumāna), but for some schools of orthodox Hinduism the "received textual tradition" (Sanskrit: āgamāḥ) is an epistemological category equal to perception and inference. The Buddhist logical tradition of Dignaga and Dharmakirti accept scriptural tradition only if it accords with pratyakṣa and anumāna. This view is thus in line with the Buddha's injunction in the Kalama Sutta not to accept anything on mere tradition or scripture.

== Early Buddhist background ==
=== Epistemology ===
The time of the Gautama Buddha was a lively intellectual culture with many differing philosophical theories. KN Jayatilleke, in his "Early Buddhist Theory of Knowledge", uses the Pali Nikayas to glean the possible epistemological views of the historical Buddha and those of his contemporaries. According to his analysis of the Saṅgārava-sutta (AN 3.60), during the Buddha's time, Indian views were divided into three major camps with regards to knowledge:

- The Traditionalists (anussavika) who regarded knowledge as being derived from scriptural sources (the Brahmins who upheld the Vedas).
- The Rationalists (takki vimamsi) who only used reasoning or takka (the skeptics and materialists).
- The "Experientialists" who held that besides reasoning, a kind of supra-normal yogic insight was able to bring about unique forms of knowledge (the Jains, the middle and late Upanishadic sages).

The Buddha rejected the first view in several texts such as the Kalama sutta, arguing that a claim to scriptural authority (sadda) was not a source of knowledge, as was claimed by the later Hindu Mimamsa school. The Buddha also seems to have criticized those who used reason (takka). According to Jayatilleke, in the Pali Nikayas, this term refers "primarily to denote the reasoning that was employed to construct and defend metaphysical theories and perhaps meant the reasoning of sophists and dialecticians only in a secondary sense". The Buddha rejected metaphysical speculations, and put aside certain questions which he named the unanswerables (avyakatas), including questions about the soul and if the universe is eternal or not.

The Buddha's epistemological view has been a subject of debate among modern scholars. Some such as David Kalupahana, have seen him first and foremost as an empiricist because of his teaching that knowledge required verification through the six sense fields (ayatanas). The Kalama sutta states that verification through one's own personal experience (and the experiences of the wise) is an important means of knowledge.

However, the Buddha's view of truth was also based on the soteriological and therapeutic concern of ending suffering. In the "Discourse to Prince Abhaya" (MN.I.392–4) the Buddha states that a belief should only be accepted if it leads to wholesome consequences. This has led scholars such as Mrs Rhys Davids and Vallée-Poussin to see the Buddha's view as a form of Pragmatism. This sense of truth as what is useful is also shown by the Buddha's parable of the arrow.

K. N. Jayatilleke sees Buddha's epistemological view as a kind of empiricism which also includes a particular view of causation (dependent origination): "inductive inferences in Buddhism are based on a theory of causation. These inferences are made on the data of perception. What is considered to constitute knowledge are direct inferences made on the basis of such perceptions." Jayatilleke argues the Buddhas statements in the Nikayas tacitly imply an adherence to some form of correspondence theory, this is most explicit in the Apannaka Sutta (MN 60). He also notes that Coherentism is also taken as a criterion for truth in the Nikayas, which contains many instances of the Buddha debating opponents by showing how they have contradicted themselves. He also notes that the Buddha seems to have held that utility and truth go hand in hand, and therefore something which is true is also useful (and vice versa, something false is not useful for ending suffering).

Echoing this view, Christian Coseru writes:

canonical sources make quite clear that several distinct factors play a crucial role in the acquisition of knowledge. These are variously identified with the testimony of sense experience, introspective or intuitive experience, inferences drawn from these two types of experience, and some form of coherentism, which demands that truth claims remain consistent across the entire corpus of doctrine. Thus, to the extent that Buddhists employ reason, they do so primarily in order further to advance the empirical investigation of phenomena.

=== Debate and analysis ===
The Early Buddhist Texts show that during this period many different kinds of philosophers often engaged in public debates (vivada). The early texts also mention that there was a set procedure (patipada) for these debates and that if someone does not abide by it they are unsuitable to be debated. There also seems to have been at least a basic conception of valid and invalid reasoning, including, according to Jayatilleke, fallacies (hetvabhasah) such as petitio principii. Various fallacies were further covered under what were called nigrahasthana or "reasons for censure" by which one could lose the debate. Other nigrahasthanas included arthantaram or "shifting the topic", and not giving a coherent reply.

According to Jayatilleke, 'pure reasoning' or 'a priori' reasoning is rejected by the Buddha as a source of knowledge. While reason could be useful in deliberation, it could not establish truth on its own.

In contrast to his opponents, the Buddha termed himself a defender of 'analysis' or 'vibhajjavada'. He held that after proper rational analysis, assertions could be classified in the following way:

- Those assertions which can be asserted or denied categorically (ekamsika)
- Those which cannot be asserted or denied categorically (anekamsika), which the Buddha further divided into:
  - Those which after analysis (vibhajja-) could be known to be true or false.
  - Those like the avyakata-theses, which could not be thus known.

This view of analysis differed from that of the Jains, which held that all views were anekamsika and also were relative, that is, they were true or false depending on the standpoint one viewed it from (anekantavada).

The early texts also mention that the Buddha held there to be "four kinds of explanations of questions."

- a question which ought to be explained categorically
- a question which ought to be answered with a counter question
- a question which ought to be set aside (thapaniya)
- a question which ought to be explained analytically

The Buddha also made use of various terms which reveal some of his views on meaning and language. For example, he held that many concepts or designations (paññatti) could be used in conventional everyday speech while at the same time not referring to anything that exists ultimately (such as the pronouns like "I" and "Me"). Richard Hayes likewise points to the Potthapada sutta as an example of the Early Buddhist tendency towards a nominalist perspective on language and meaning in contrast to the Brahmanical view which tended to see language as reflecting real existents.

The Buddha also divided statements (bhasitam) into two types with regards to their meaning: those which were intelligible, meaningful (sappatihirakatam) and those meaningless or incomprehensible (appatihirakatam). According to Jayatilleke, "in the Nikayas it is considered meaningless to make a statement unless the speaker could attach a verifiable content to each of its terms." This is why the Buddha held that statements about the existence of a self or soul (atman) were ultimately meaningless, because they could not be verified.

The Buddha, like his contemporaries, also made use of the "four corners" (catuṣkoṭi) logical structure as a tool in argumentation. According to Jayatilleke, these "four forms of predication" can be rendered thus:

1. S is P, e.g. atthi paro loko (there is a next world).
2. S is not P, e.g. natthi paro loko (there is no next world).
3. S is and is not P, e.g. atthi ca natthi ca paro loko (there is and is no next world).
4. S neither is nor is not P, e.g. n'ev'atthi na natthi paro loko (there neither is nor is there no next world)

The Buddha in the Nikayas seems to regard these as "'the four possible positions or logical alternatives that a proposition can take". Jayatilleke notes that the last two are clearly non-Aristotelian in nature. The Buddhists in the Nikayas use this logical structure to analyze the truth of statements and classify them. When all four were denied regarding a statement or question, it was held to be meaningless and thus set aside or rejected (but not negated).

=== Two levels of Truth ===
The early texts mention two modes of discourse used by the Buddha. Jayatilleke writes:

when he is speaking about things or persons we should not presume that he is speaking about entities or substances; to this extent his meaning is to be inferred (neyyattha-). But when he is pointing out the misleading implications of speech or using language without these implications, his meaning is plain and direct and nothing is to be inferred (nitattha-). This is a valid distinction which certainly holds good for the Nikäyas at least, in the light of the above-statement.

The later commentarial and Abhidharma literature began to use this distinction as an epistemic one. They spoke of two levels of truth, the conventional (samutti), and the absolute (paramattha). This theory of double truth became very influential in later Buddhist epistemic discourse.

=== Kathāvatthu ===
The Theravada Kathāvatthu (Points of Controversy) is a Pali Buddhist text which discusses the proper method for critical discussions on doctrine. Its date is debated by scholars but it might date to the time of Ashoka (C. 240 BC). Western scholarship by St. Schayer and following him A. K. Warder, have argued that there is an "anticipations of propositional logic" in the text. However, according to Jonardon Ganeri "the leading concern of the text is with issues of balance and fairness in the conduct of a dialogue and it recommends a strategy of argumentation which guarantees that both parties to a point of controversy have their arguments properly weighed and considered."

In the Kathāvatthu, a proper reasoned dialogue (vadayutti) is structured as follows: there is a point of contention – whether A is B; this is divided into several 'openings' (atthamukha):

1. Is A B?
2. Is A not B?
3. Is A B everywhere?
4. Is A B always?
5. Is A B in everything?
6. Is A not B everywhere?
7. Is A not B always?
8. Is A not B in everything?

These help clarify the attitude of someone towards their thesis in the proceeding argumentative process. Jonardon Ganeri outlines the process thus:

Each such ‘opening’ now proceeds as an independent dialogue, and each is divided into five stages: the way forward (anuloma), the way back (patikamma), the refutation (niggaha), the application (upanayana) and the conclusion (niggamana). In the way forward, the proponent solicits from the respondent the endorsement of a thesis and then tries to argue against it. On the way back, the respondent turns the tables, soliciting from the proponent the endorsement of the counter-thesis, and then trying argue against it. In the refutation, the respondent, continuing, seeks to refute the argument that the proponent had advanced against the thesis. The application and conclusion repeat and reaffirm that the proponent’s argument against the respondent’s thesis is unsound, while the respondent’s argument against the proponent’s counter-thesis is sound.

=== Milindapanha ===
Another Buddhist text which depicts the standards for rational debate among Buddhists is the Milindapanha ("Questions of Menander", 1st century BCE) which is a dialogue between the Buddhist monk Nagasena and an Indo-Greek King. In describing the art of debate and dialogue, Nagasena states:

When scholars talk a matter over one with another, then is there a winding up, an unravelling, one or other is convicted of error, and he then acknowledges his mistake; distinctions are drawn, and contra-distinctions; and yet thereby they are not angered.

The various elements outlined here make up the standard procedure of Buddhist debate theory. There is an 'unravelling' or explication (nibbethanam) of one's thesis and stances and then there is also a 'winding up' ending in the censure (niggaho) of one side based on premises he has accepted and the rejoinders of his opponent.

=== Abhidharma views ===
The Buddhist Abhidharma schools developed a classification of four types of reasoning which became widely used in Buddhist thought. The Mahayana philosopher Asanga in his Abhidharma-samuccaya, outlines these four reasons (yukti) that one may use to inquire about the nature of things. According to Cristian Coseru these are:

1. The principle of dependence (apeksāyukti), which takes into account the fact that conditioned things necessarily arise in dependence upon conditions: it is a principle of reason, for instance, that sprouts depend on seeds.
2. The principle of causal efficacy (kāryakāranayukti), which accounts for the difference between things in terms of the different causal conditions for their apprehension: it is a principle of reason, thus, that, in dependence upon form, a faculty of vision, and visual awareness, one has visual rather than, say, auditory or tactile experiences.
3. The realization of evidence from experience (sāksātkriyāsādhanayukti). We realize the presence of water from moisture and of fire from smoke.
4. The principle of natural reasoning, or the principle of reality (dharmatāyukti), which concerns the phenomenal character of things as perceived (for instance, the wetness and fluidity of water).

According to Coseru "what we have here are examples of natural reasoning or of reasoning from experience, rather than attempts to use deliberative modes of reasoning for the purpose of justifying a given thesis or arguing for its conditions of satisfaction."

== Nyaya influences ==
The Nyaya school considers perception, inference, comparison/analogy, and testimony from reliable sources as four means to correct knowledge, holding that perception is the ultimate source of such knowledge.

The Nyāya Sūtras of Gotama (6th century BC – 2nd century CE) is the founding text of the Nyaya school. The text systematically lays out logical rules for argumentation in the form of a five-step schema and also sets forth a theory of epistemology. According to Jonardon Ganeri, the Nyaya sutra brought about a transformation in Indian thinking about logic. First, it began a shift away from interest in argumentation and debate towards the formal properties of sound inference. Secondly, the Nyaya sutra led a shift to rule-governed forms of logical thinking.

=== Nyāya and Buddhist Epistemology ===
The influence of Nyāya on Buddhist epistemology is profound, especially in the development of the four major pramāṇa (valid means of knowledge). Below is a breakdown of how Buddhist thinkers integrated and adapted Nyāya concepts in their philosophical systems:

Nyāya Influence on Buddhist Epistemology
Nyāya Concept	Buddhist Adaptation	Key Buddhist Thinkers & Texts
Perception (pratyakṣa)	Buddhism expanded the concept of perception to include not just sensory data but also insight into phenomena's impermanence and interdependence.	Dharmakīrti's Pramāṇavārttika emphasizes direct perception to analyze impermanence and the non-self.
Inference (anumāna)	Buddhist philosophers, particularly Dharmakīrti, used inference to establish causality and to demonstrate the non-essential nature of self and phenomena.	Nāgārjuna's arguments against inherent existence use inference to show that all things depend on causes and conditions (dependent origination).
Comparison (upamāna)	Analogies are used extensively in Buddhist texts to illustrate complex, abstract ideas such as emptiness (śūnyatā).	Used by early Madhyamaka thinkers to clarify ideas of non-self and impermanence, and by Vasubandhu to elucidate the nature of consciousness.
Testimony (śabda)	The Buddha's teachings are treated as authoritative testimony, much like sacred texts in Nyāya. In Buddhism, this is used to validate the path to liberation (nirvāṇa).	Yogācāra texts often stress the importance of authoritative testimony (śabda) to understand the nature of consciousness and the path to enlightenment.

=== Nyāya and Buddhist Logic ===
Another significant area of influence was in the domain of logic. Nyāya's formal system of inference (anumāna) directly impacted Buddhist logic, especially in the works of scholars like Dharmakīrti. Nyāya's focus on hetu (reasoning or cause) and the structure of valid arguments was adopted and modified by Buddhists in their development of logical proofs (pramāṇa) to support doctrines like impermanence and non-self.

In the Pramāṇavārttika, Dharmakīrti reinterpreted Nyāya's logical tools to fit within Buddhist metaphysical views. For example, Nyāya's approach to inference was used to argue against essentialist doctrines by showing that all phenomena are dependent on causes and conditions (dependent origination), rather than existing inherently (svabhāva). In Mādhyamika philosophy, Nāgārjuna and Śāntideva also employed logic and dialectical reasoning, heavily influenced by Nyāya, to argue against Nyāya's own concept of an unchanging self.

=== Nyāya and Buddhist Debate Practices ===
The formal practice of debate (yukti) in Buddhist scholasticism, especially within monastic institutions, reflects the influence of Nyāya. The rigorous techniques of formal reasoning and logical debate in Nyāya were adopted by Buddhists to engage in systematic argumentation, not only with other philosophical schools but also within their own traditions.

Buddhist monastic institutions, particularly in India, followed a debate structure built on Nyāya’s epistemological principles, emphasizing the importance of valid reasoning and evidence in defending doctrinal views. These debates often centered around the validity of pramāṇas and the nature of reality (impermanence and non-self versus permanence and self). In Tibet and East Asia, these debates became central to the scholastic tradition and helped refine Buddhist thought over centuries.

=== Nyāya Influence in Later Buddhist Traditions ===
The impact of Nyāya was not confined to early Indian Buddhist thinkers but continued to shape later Buddhist traditions. For example, Tibetan Buddhism developed sophisticated methods of debate and logic that were heavily influenced by Indian Nyāya. In the Gelug school, the Pramāṇa texts of Dharmakīrti became a central part of the curriculum, alongside Nyāya texts.

In addition, Zen Buddhism and Chan Buddhism also exhibited traces of logical techniques influenced by the early scholastics of India, where rational discourse was used to sharpen the practitioner's understanding of emptiness (śūnyatā) and impermanence.

=== Further Developments and Synthesis ===
In addition to Dharmakīrti and Nāgārjuna, Buddhist thinkers like Vasubandhu and Śāntideva also utilized Nyāya-derived logic in their writings. Vasubandhu's work in the Abhidharma tradition integrated Nyāya's inference and perception frameworks to argue for emptiness and the illusion of permanence in all things.

Moreover, Tibetan Buddhist scholars like Chandrakirti and Jamyang Zhépa further developed these ideas, showing that the dialogue between Nyāya and Buddhism was not a one-way flow but rather an ongoing intellectual exchange that continued across centuries and geographical regions.

B.K. Matilal outlines the five steps or limbs of the Nyaya method of reasoning as follows:

1. There is fire on the hill. [thesis]
2. For there is smoke. [reason]
3. (Wherever there is smoke, there is fire), as in the kitchen. [example]
4. This is such a case (smoke on the hill).
5. Therefore, it is so, i.e., there is fire on the hill.

Later Buddhist thinkers like Vasubandhu would see several of these steps as redundant and would affirm that only the first two or three were necessary.

The Naiyayikas (the Nyaya scholars) also accepted four valid means (pramaṇa) of obtaining valid knowledge (pramana) - perception (pratyakṣa), inference (anumāna), comparison (upamāna) and word/testimony of reliable sources (śabda).

The systematic discussions of the Nyaya school influenced the Medieval Buddhist philosophers who developed their own theories of inferential reasoning and epistemic warrant (pramana). The Nyaya became one of the main opponents of the Buddhists.

== Vaiśeṣika Influences ==
While the direct influence of the Vaiśeṣika school on Buddhism was limited compared to that of the Nyāya school, certain concepts from Vaiśeṣika philosophy did inform or prompt responses within Buddhist thought, particularly in the context of Atomism, metaphysics, and conceptual classification. The influence was often indirect, occurring through shared intellectual debates and through the later fusion of Nyāya and Vaiśeṣika into a combined tradition.

=== Historical Context ===
The Vaiśeṣika school, traditionally attributed to the sage Kaṇāda, emerged around the 2nd century BCE and developed a detailed realist metaphysical system centered on the analysis of substances, qualities, motion, and universals. While Buddhist traditions primarily emphasized ethical practice, meditation, and liberation from suffering, by the time of the Abhidharma scholastic period, Buddhist scholars began to systematize their own metaphysical and epistemological positions, sometimes in response to or dialogue with non-Buddhist systems like Vaiśeṣika.

=== Atomism and Ontological Categories ===
Vaiśeṣika philosophy is considered one of the earliest proponents of atomism in Indian thought. According to this view, all material objects are composed of indivisible, eternal atoms (paramāṇu) of four elements: earth, water, fire, and air. These atoms combine through conjunction (saṃyoga) and inherence (Samavāya) to form complex, perceivable objects.

Buddhist schools, particularly the Sarvāstivāda and later Theravāda Abhidhamma and Yogācāra traditions, developed their own theories of atomism and constituent elements (dharmas). These Buddhist atoms, however, were fundamentally momentary and non-substantial, existing only in a single instant before giving rise to a successor. While structurally similar in positing basic building blocks of reality, Buddhist atomism served a different function: not to establish a permanent material substratum, but to support doctrines of impermanence (anitya) and dependent origination.

Some scholars suggest that the development of Buddhist atomism may have been in part a philosophical response to the atomistic realism of Vaiśeṣika, offering a counter-theory that maintained empirical rigor without conceding to metaphysical permanence.

=== Epistemology and Debate Culture ===
Vaiśeṣika epistemology, though not as developed as Nyāya's, accepted perception (Pratyakṣa) and inference (anumāna) as valid means of knowledge (Pramāṇa). Over time, Vaiśeṣika and Nyāya merged into a unified system, often referred to as the Nyāya-Vaiśeṣika school, particularly from the post-Uddyotakara period (c. 5th century CE onward). This synthesis brought Vaiśeṣika metaphysics into the sphere of logical and epistemological debate.

Buddhist logicians, especially Dignāga and Dharmakīrti, engaged deeply with Nyāya-Vaiśeṣika thinkers, critiquing their views on perception, inference, and universals. While these critiques were often aimed at Nyāya formulations, many of the underlying metaphysical positions—such as the reality of substances or inherence—were drawn from Vaiśeṣika doctrines.

This interaction spurred Buddhist thinkers to clarify and refine their own positions on cognition, objecthood, and conceptual construction (vikalpa). For example, Dharmakīrti's theory of Apoha (exclusion) as the basis of conceptual cognition can be read as a direct challenge to both Vaiśeṣika's realist universals (Sāmānya) and their role in perception.

=== Shared Frameworks and Divergences ===
There are also conceptual parallels that may reflect shared cultural and intellectual frameworks rather than direct influence. For instance, both Vaiśeṣika and Buddhist Abhidharma employ classificatory taxonomies to understand reality. Vaiśeṣika lists six or seven categories of being (Padārtha), including substance, quality, motion, generality, particularity, and inherence. Abhidharma texts similarly analyze reality into lists of mental and physical phenomena (dharmas), though from a phenomenological rather than ontological standpoint.

However, the purpose and metaphysical commitments of these taxonomies diverge significantly. Vaiśeṣika aims at a stable ontology of the external world, whereas Buddhist taxonomy serves soteriological aims by analyzing experience into impermanent, non-self constituents.

=== Conclusion ===
While Vaiśeṣika did not exert a dominant or sustained influence on Buddhist philosophy, its presence in the broader philosophical landscape of classical India prompted Buddhist responses—especially in areas of atomism, realism, and classification. These responses were often critical and reformulative, leading to uniquely Buddhist formulations of key metaphysical and epistemological concepts. Through its integration with Nyāya, Vaiśeṣika indirectly contributed to shaping Buddhist logic and theory of knowledge during the scholastic and classical periods of Indian philosophy.

== Mahayana Buddhist philosophy ==
=== Nagarjuna's Madhyamaka ===
Nagarjuna (c. 150 – c. 250 CE), one of the most influential Buddhist thinkers, defended the theory of the emptiness (shunyata) of phenomena and attacked theories that posited an essence or true existence (svabhava) to phenomena in his magnum opus The Fundamental Verses on the Middle Way. He used the Buddhist catuṣkoṭi ("four corners" or "four positions") to construct reductio ad absurdum arguments against numerous theories which posited essences to certain phenomena, such as causality and movement. In Nagarjuna's works and those of his followers, the four positions on a particular thesis are negated or ruled out (pratiṣedha) as exemplified by the first verse of Nagarjuna's Middle way verses which focuses on a critique of causation:

Entities of any kind are not ever found anywhere produced from themselves, from another, from both [themselves and another], and also from no cause.

Nagarjuna also famously relied upon refutation based argumentation (vitanda) drawing out the consequences (prasaṅga) and presuppositions of his opponents' own theories and showing them to be self refuting. Because the vaitandika only seeks to disprove his opponents arguments without putting forward a thesis of his own, the Hindu Nyaya school philosophers such as Vatsyayana saw it as unfair and also irrational (because if you argue against P, you must have a thesis, mainly not-P). According to Matilal, Nagarjuna's position of not putting forth any implied thesis through his refutations would be rational if seen as a form of illocutionary act.

Nagarjuna's reductions and the structure of the catuṣkoṭi became very influential in the Buddhist Madhyamaka school of philosophy which sees itself as a continuation of Nagarjuna's thought. Nagarjuna also discusses the four modes of knowing of the Nyaya school, but he is unwilling to accept that such epistemic means bring us ultimate knowledge.

Nagarjuna's epistemic stance continues to be debated among modern scholars, his skepticism of the ability of reason and language to capture the nature of reality and his view of reality as being empty of true existence have led some to see him as a skeptic, mystic, nihilist or agnostic, while others interpret him as a Wittgensteinian analyst, an anti-realist, or deconstructionist.

Nagarjuna is also said to be the author of the Upāyaśṛdaya one of the first Buddhist texts on proper reasoning and argumentation. He also developed the Buddhist theory of two truths, defending ultimate truth as the truth of emptiness.

=== Vasubandhu ===
Vasubandhu was one of the first Buddhist thinkers to write various works on sound reasoning and debate, including the Vādavidhi (Methods of Debate), and the Vādavidhāna (Rules of Debate).

Vasubandhu was influenced by the system of the Nyaya school. Vasubandhu introduced the concept of 'logical pervasion' (vyapti). He also introduced the trairūpya (triple inferential sign).

The trairūpya is a logical argument that contains three constituents which a logical ‘sign’ or ‘mark’ (linga) must fulfill to be 'valid source of knowledge' (pramana):

1. It should be present in the case or object under consideration, the ‘subject-locus' (pakṣa)
2. It should be present in a ‘similar case’ or a homologue (sapakṣa)
3. It should not be present in any ‘dissimilar case’ or heterologue (vipakṣa)

== Pramāṇavāda ==
=== Dignāga ===
Buddhist epistemology holds that perception and inference are the means to correct knowledge.

Dignāga (c. 480 – 540 CE) is the founder of an eponymous tradition of Buddhist logic and epistemology which was widely influential in Indian philosophy due to the introduction of unique epistemological questions. According to B.K. Matilal, Dignāga "was perhaps the most creative logician in medieval (400-1100) India."

Dignāga's tradition of Buddhist logic is sometimes called the "School of Dignāga" or "The School of Dinnāga and Dharmakīrti". In Tibetan, it is often called “those who follow reasoning” (Tibetan: rigs pa rjes su ‘brang ba); in modern literature, it is sometimes known by the Sanskrit "pramāṇavāda", often translated as "the epistemological school" or "the logico-epistemological school."

Dignāga defended the validity of only two pramāṇas (instruments of knowledge), perception and inference, in his magnum opus, the Pramāṇa-samuccaya.

His theory does not "make a radical distinction between epistemology and the psychological processes of cognition." As noted by Cristian Coseru, Dignāga's theory of knowledge is strongly grounded in perception "as an epistemic modality for establishing a cognitive event as knowledge".

Since perception is information that is acquired through the senses, it is not susceptible to error. However, there is susceptibility to error in processes of interpretation, including mental construction and inferential thinking.

Dignāga also wrote on language and meaning. His "apoha" (exclusion) theory of meaning was widely influential. For Dignāga, a word can express its own meaning only by repudiating other meanings. The word 'cow' gives its own meaning only by the exclusion of all those things which are other than cow.

=== Dharmakīrti ===
Following Dignāga, Dharmakīrti (c. 7th century), contributed significantly to the development and application of Buddhist pramana theory. Dharmakīrti's Pramāṇavārttika, remains in Tibet as a central text on pramana and was widely commented on by various Indian and Tibetan scholars.

Dharmakīrti's theory of epistemology differed from Dignāga's by introducing the idea that for something to be a valid cognition it must "confirm causal efficacy" (arthakriyāsthiti) which "consists in [this cognition’s] compliance with [the object’s capacity to] perform a function" (Pramāṇavārttika 2.1ac).

He was also one of the primary theorists of Buddhist atomism, according to which the only items considered to exist or be ultimately real are momentary particulars (svalakṣaṇa) including material atoms and momentary states of consciousness (dharmas). Everything else is considered to be only conventional (saṃvṛtisat) and thus he has been seen as a nominalist, like Dignāga.

Vincent Eltschinger has argued that Buddhist epistemology, especially Dharmakīrti's, was an apologetic response to attacks by hostile Hindu opponents and thus was seen by Buddhists as "that which, by defeating the outsiders, removes the obstacles to the path towards liberation." Coseru meanwhile simply notes the inseparability of epistemic concerns from spiritual praxis for Buddhist epistemologists such as Dharmakīrti:

It is this praxis that leads a representative thinker such as Dharmakīrti to claim that the Buddha, whose view he and his successors claim to propound, is a true embodiment of the sources of knowledge. Thus, far from seeing a tension between empirical scrutiny and the exercise of reason, the Buddhist epistemological enterprise positions itself not merely as a dialogical disputational method for avoiding unwarranted beliefs, but as a practice aimed at achieving concrete, pragmatic ends. As Dharmakīrti reminds his fellow Buddhists, the successful accomplishment of any human goal is wholly dependent on having correct knowledge.

=== Later figures of the tradition ===
The Buddhist philosophers who are part of this pramāṇavāda tradition include numerous other figures who followed Dignāga and Dharmakīrti. They developed their theories further, commented on their works and defended their theories against Hindu and Buddhist opponents.

Fyodor Stcherbatsky divided the followers and commentators on Dharmakirti into three main groups:

- The philological school of commentators, these figures (such as Devendrabuddhi and Śākyabuddhi) focused on "exactly rendering the direct meaning of the commented text without losing oneself in its deeper implications". They all commented on the Pramāṇavārttika.
- The Kashmiri school of philosophy, which sought to "disclose the deep philosophic contents of the system of Dignāga and Dharmakīrti, regarding it as a critical system of logic and epistemology." Its founding figure was Dharmottara (8th century), a philosopher from Kashmir who wrote some independent works and also a commentary on Dharmakīrti's Nyāyabindu and on his Pramanaviniscaya.
- The religious school of commentators, who sought to "disclose the profound meaning of Dharmakirti's works and to reveal their concealed ultimate tendency." Unlike the Kashmiri school, which saw Dharmakīrti's work as primarily focused on epistemology and reasoning, the "religious" school used Dharmakīrti in order to develop and comment on the entirety of the metaphysics of Mahayana Buddhism. The founder of this school was the layman Prajñakaragupta (740–800 C.E.), an important and original thinker who introduced various new perspectives into the Pramāṇavāda tradition, such as backwards causation. He is the author of the large commentary, the Pramāṇavārttikālaṅkāra ("Ornament of the Pramāṇavārttikā").

Some of the other figures of the epistemological school include:

- Īśvarasena, a disciple of Dignāga, and teacher of Dharmakīrti
- Śaṅkarasvāmin, wrote an introduction to Dignāga's logic
- Jinendrabuddhi (7th or 8th century), a commentator on Dignāga's Pramanasamuccaya
- Bāhuleya, a commentator on Dignāga's Nyāyamukha
- Śubhakara (650–750), was particularly noteworthy because he composed a work which aimed at proving the objective reality of external things and thus attempted to disprove Vijñānavāda (the doctrine of consciousness, idealism)
- Śākyabuddhi (ca. 700 C.E.), wrote a commentary on Dharmakīrti's Pramāṇavārttika
- Chandragomin, purported author of the *Nyāyasiddhyāloka
- Anandavardhana, wrote a sub commentary to Dharmottara's Pramana-viniscaya commentary.
- Vinītadeva (8th century), wrote a commentary on Dharmakīrti's Nyāyabindu
- Śāntabhadra, wrote a commentary on Dharmakīrti's Nyāyabindu
- Jinamitra, wrote a commentary on Dharmakīrti's Nyāyabindu
- Devendrabuddhi (7th century), wrote various commentaries, including one on Dharmakīrti's Pramāṇavārttika
- Karṇakagomin, wrote a commentary on Dharmakīrti's Pramāṇavārttika
- Manorathanandin, wrote a commentary on Dharmakīrti's Pramāṇavārttika
- Śakyamati, wrote a commentary on Dharmakīrti's Pramāṇavārttika
- Arcaṭa, wrote a commentary on Dharmakīrti's Hetubindu
- Jina, a follower of Prajñakaragupta
- Ravigupta, a follower of Prajñakaragupta
- Yamari, a follower of Prajñakaragupta
- Śubhagupta (720–780), was a Vaibhāṣika writer on pramana who wrote a proof of the external world
- Śaṅkaranandana (10th century), a prolific author of at least 17 texts, known as "the second Dharmakīrti."
- Jñanasrimitra (975–1025), a "gate-scholar" at Vikramashila who wrote several original works
- Paṇḍita Aśoka (980–1040)
- Jñanasribhadra (1000–1100), wrote a commentary on the Pramāṇaviniścaya (Dharmakīrti)
- Jayanta (1020–1080), author of the Pramāṇavārttikālaṅkāraṭīkā, a commentary on Prajñakaragupta's text.
- Jitāri or Jetāri (940–1000), teacher of Atisha and author of numerous pramana texts.
- Durvekamiśra (970–1030), a disciple of Jitāri
- Ratnakīrti (11th century), a student of Jñanasrimitra
- Mokṣākaragupta (11th–12th centuries), author of the Tarkabhāṣā
- Vidyākaraśānti (1100–1200), author of the Tarkasopāna
- Śākyaśrībhadra, a Kashmiri pandita who was the teacher of the Tibetan Sakya Pandita

=== Influence and reception ===
Dignāga also influenced non-Buddhist Sanskrit thinkers. According to Lawrence J. McCrea, and Parimal G. Patil, Dignāga set in motion an "epistemic turn" in Indian philosophy:

In the centuries following Dignāga’s work, virtually all philosophical questions were reconfigured as epistemological ones. That is, when making any claim at all, it came to be seen as incumbent on a philosopher to situate that claim within a fully developed theory of knowledge. The systematic articulation and interrogation of the underlying presuppositions of all knowledge claims thus became the central preoccupation of most Sanskrit philosophers.

The Hindu philosophers, especially those of the Nyāya, Vaiseshika and Vedanta schools, were in constant debate with the Buddhist epistemologists, developing arguments to defend their realist position against the nominalism of the Buddhists. Nyāya-Vaiseshika thinkers such as Uddyotakara and Prashastapada critiqued the views of Dignaga as they developed their own philosophy.

Vācaspati Miśra's Nyāya-vārtika-tātparya-tikā is almost entirely focused on outlining and defeating the arguments of the Buddhist epistemologists. Prabhākara (active c. 6th century) meanwhile, may have been influenced by Buddhist reasoning to move away from some of the realistic views of older Mīmāṃsā thought. The Vedanta scholar Śrīharṣa who attacked the realism of Nyāya may have been influenced by the Buddhists as well. Even the "New Reason" (Navya Nyāya) scholar Gaṅgeśa Upādhyāya shows an influence from the Buddhist epistemological school, in his arrangement of his Tattvacintāmaṇi.

=== Svātantrika Mādhyamika ===
==== Bhāvaviveka ====
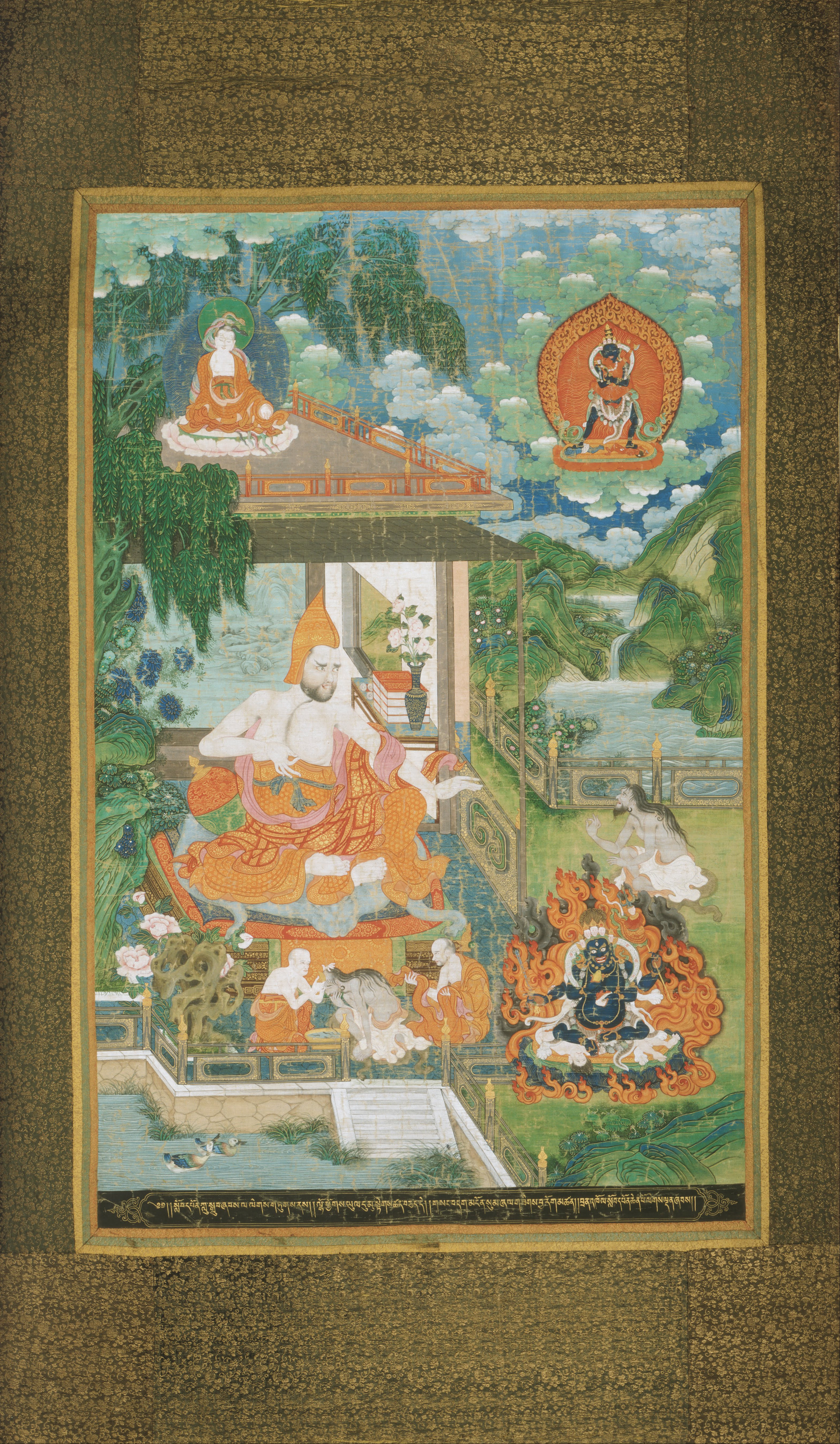
Ācārya Bhāviveka Converts a Nonbeliever to Buddhism, Gelug 18th-century Qing painting in the Philadelphia Museum of Art

Bhāvaviveka (c. 500 – c. 578) appears to be the first Buddhist logician to employ the "formal syllogism" (Wylie: sbyor ba'i tshig; Sanskrit: prayoga-vākya) in expounding the Mādhyamaka view, which he employed to considerable effect in his commentary to Nagarjuna's Mūlamadhyamakakārikā entitled the Prajñāpradīpa. To develop his arguments for emptiness, Bhāvaviveka drew on the work of Dignāga which put forth a new way of presenting logical arguments.

Bhāvaviveka was later criticized by Chandrakirti (540–600) for his use of these positive logical arguments. For Chandrakirti, a true Mādhyamika only uses reductio ad absurdum arguments and does not put forth positive arguments. Chandrakirti saw in the logico-epistemic tradition a commitment to a foundationalist epistemology and essentialist ontology. For Chandrakirti, a Mādhyamika's job should be to just deconstruct concepts which presuppose an essence.

==== Yogācāra-svātantrika Mādhyamika ====
In spite of Chandrakirti's critique, later Buddhist philosophers continued to explain Madhyamaka philosophy through the use of formal syllogisms as well as adopting the conceptual schemas of the Dignaga-Dharmakirti school along with those of the closely related Yogacara school). These figures include Jñanagarbha (700–760), Śāntarakṣita (725–788), Kamalaśīla, Haribhadra and Ratnākaraśānti (c.1000). Another thinker who worked on both pramana and Madhyamaka was the Kashmiri pandita Parahitabhadra.

This tendency within Madhyamaka is termed Svātantrika, while Chandrakirti's stance is termed Prasangika. The Svatantrika-Prasaṅgika distinction is a central topic of debate in Tibetan Buddhist philosophy. In Tibetan Buddhism, those who follow this method and also make use of Yogācāra doctrines are called Yogācāra-Svātantrika Mādhyamika (Tibetan: Rnal ’byor spyod pa’i dbu ma rang rgyud pa).

Probably the most influential figure in this tradition is Śāntarakṣita. According to James Blumenthal

Śāntarakṣita attempted to integrate the anti-essentialism of Nāgārjuna with the logico-epistemological thought of Dignāga (ca. 6th c.) and Dharmakīrti (ca. 7th c.) along with facets of Yogācāra/Cittamātra thought into one internally consistent, yet fundamentally Madhyamaka system.

This synthesis is one of the last major developments in Indian Buddhist thought, and has been influential on Tibetan Buddhist philosophy.

=== In the Tibetan tradition ===
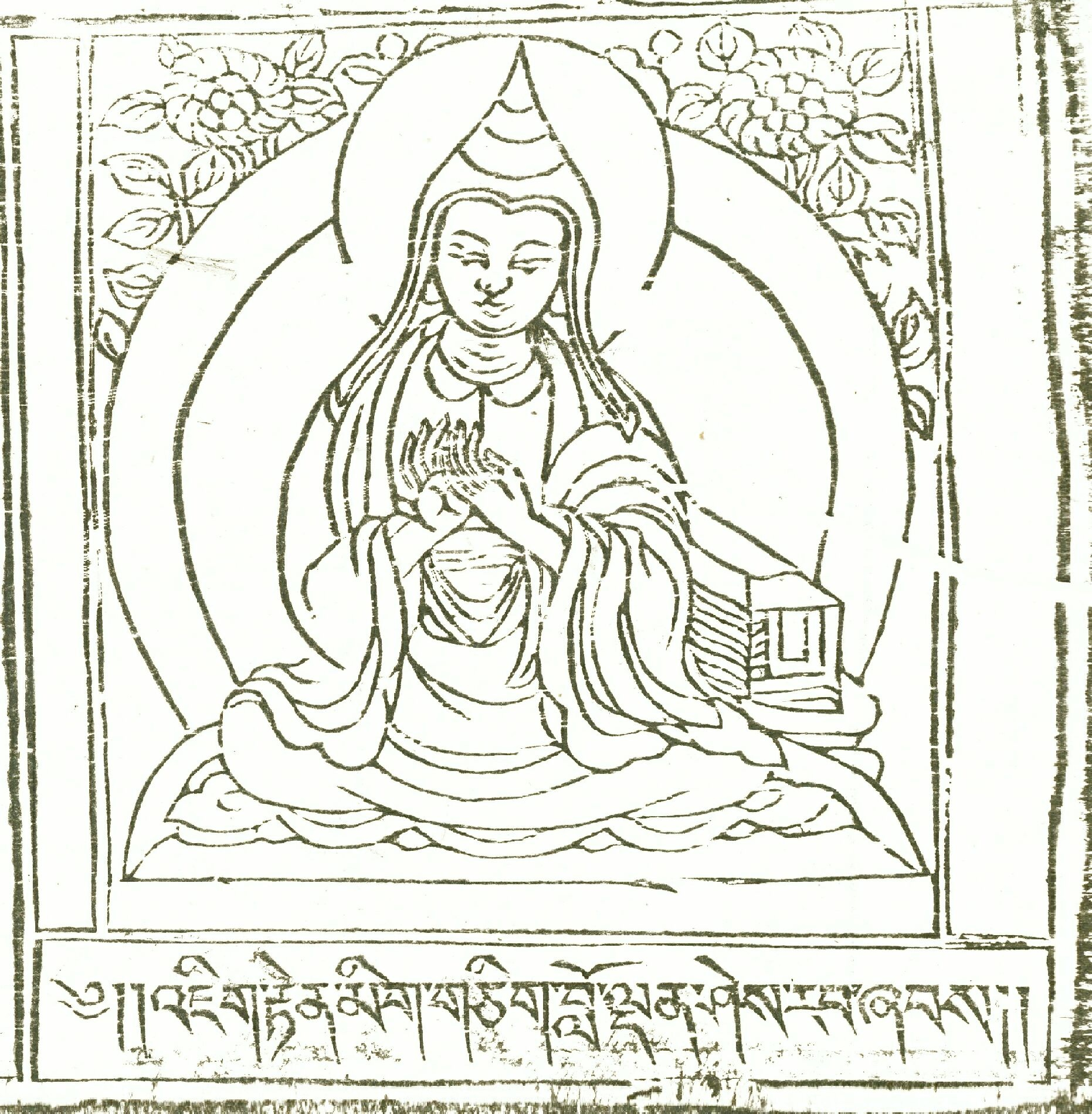
Ngok Loden Sherab

Tom Tillemans, in discussing the Tibetan translation and assimilation of the logico-epistemological tradition, identifies two currents and transmission streams:

The first is the tradition of the Kadampa scholar Ngok Lodzawa Loden Shayrap (1059–1109) and Chapa Chögyi Sengge (1109–69) and their disciples, mainly located at Sangpu Neutok. Chapa's Tshad ma’i bsdus pa (English: "Summaries of Epistemology and Logic") became the groundwork for the "Collected Topics" (Tibetan: Düra; Wylie: bsdus grwa) literature, which in large part furnished the Gelugpa-based logical architecture and epistemology. These two scholars (whose works are now lost) strengthened the influence of Dharmakirti in Tibetan Buddhist scholarship.

There is also another tradition of interpretation founded by Sakya Pandita (1182–1251), who wrote the Tshad-ma rigs-gter (English: "Treasury of Logic on Valid Cognition"). Sakya pandita secured the place of Dharmakirti's Pramanavarttika as the foundational text on epistemology in Tibet. Later thinkers of the Gelug school such as Gyeltsap and Kaydrup attempted a synthesis of the two traditions, with varying results. This is because the views of Chapa were mostly that of Philosophical realism, while Sakya pandita was an anti-realist.

== Lexicon ==
- Argument: Vada, rtsod pa
- Basis of cognition: Alambana
- Characteristic: laksana, mtshan nid
- Condition: pratyaya, rkyen
- Causal function, purpose: arthakriyā
- Debate: Vivada
- Demonstrandum: sadhya, bsgrub par bya ba
- Demonstrator: sadhaka, grub byed
- Dialectician: tartika, rtog ge ba
- Dialectics: tarka, rtog ge
- Direct perception: pratyaksa, mngon sum
- Event: dharma, chos
- Event-associate: dharmin, chos can
- Exclusion: Apoha, sel ba (Anya-apoha: gzhan sel ba)
- Exemplification: drstanta, dpe
- Inference: anumana, rjes su dpag pa
  - Inference for oneself, reasoning: svārthānumāna
  - Inference for others, demonstration: parārthānumāna
- Interference: vyavakirana, 'dres pa
- Invariable concomitance: avinabhava, med na mi 'byun ba
- Judgment: prajnanana, shes-rab
- Justification: hetu, gtan-tshigs
- Means of valid cognition: pramana, tshad ma
- Means of evidence: linga, rtags
- Particular: svalakṣaṇa
- Pervading/pervasion/logical pervasion: vyapti, khyab pa
- Perception, Sensation: pratyaksa
- Universal, General attribute: Samanyalaksana

== See also ==
- Logical connective
- Catuṣkoṭi
- Tetralemma
- Dharmakirti
- Kathavatthu
- Nyaya
- Apoha
