= Dharmakirti =

Indian Buddhist philosopher (fl.c.600–670)

Dharmakīrti
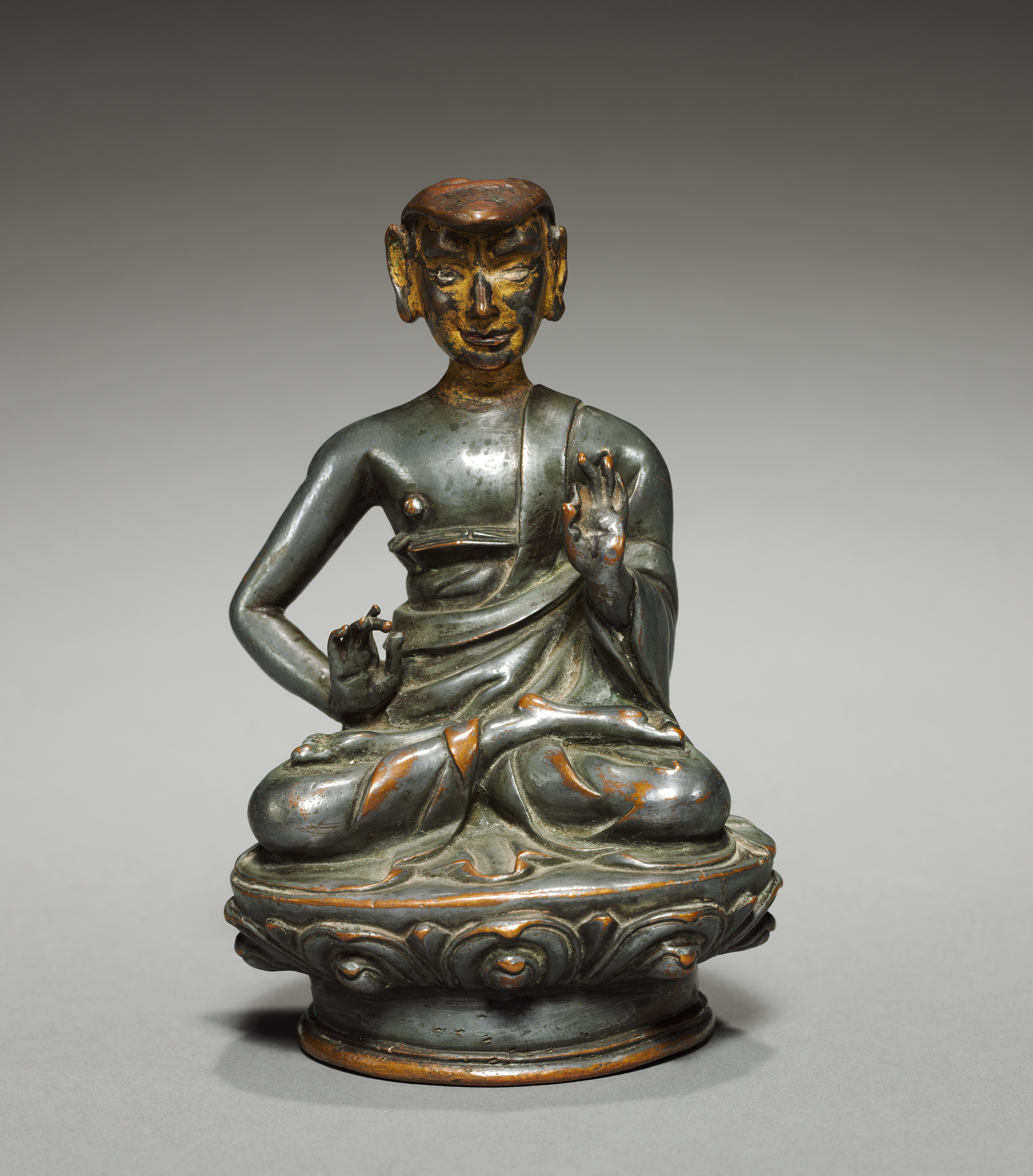
- Portrait of Dharmakirti in silver, c. 15th–16th century, at the Cleveland Museum of Art.

Personal life
- Born: c. 600 CE South India
- Died: c. 670 CE
- Education: Nalanda

Religious life
- Religion: Buddhism
- Dharma name: Buddhism

Senior posting
- Teacher: Dharmapala of Nalanda
- Students: Vajrabodhi

Dharmakīrti (fl. c. 600–670 CE) was an influential Indian Buddhist philosopher who worked at Nālandā. He was one of the key scholars of epistemology (pramāṇa) in Buddhist philosophy, and is associated with the Yogācāra and Sautrāntika schools. His works influenced the scholars of Mīmāṃsā, Nyaya and Shaivism schools of Hindu philosophy as well as scholars of Jainism.

Dharmakīrti's Pramāṇavārttika, his largest and most important work, was very influential in India and Tibet as a central text on pramana ('valid knowledge instruments'), and was widely commented on by various Indian and Tibetan scholars. His texts remain part of studies in the monasteries of Tibetan Buddhism.

== History ==
Little is known for certain about the life of Dharmakīrti. As per John Taber, the only reliable information that we have about his life was that he was a teacher at Nalanda. The Chinese monk, Yijing, who was a resident at Nalanda between the years of 675 and 685 CE, refers to Dharmakīrti as a “recent” teacher. Yijing also mentioned that a Chinese traveller called Wuxing, was studying Dharmakīrti's teachings at the Telhara monastery which is just a short distance away from Nalanda which indicates that Dharmakīrti had attained fame as a logician in Magadha around 650–660 CE.

Tibetan hagiographies suggest that Dharmakīrti (Tibetan: ཆོས་ཀྱི་གྲགས་པ་; Wylie: chos kyi grags pa) was born into a Brahmin family of South India and was the nephew of the Mīmāṃsā scholar Kumārila Bhaṭṭa. When he was young, Kumārila spoke abusively towards Dharmakīrti as he was taking his Brahminical garments. This led Dharmakīrti to take the robes of the Buddhist order instead, resolving to "vanquish all the heretics." As a student of Buddhism, he first studied under Isvarasena, and later moved to Nalanda where he interacted with the 6th century Buddhist scholar Dharmapala.

However, the accuracy of the Tibetan hagiographies is uncertain, and scholars place him in the 7th century instead. This is because of inconsistencies in different Tibetan and Chinese texts, and because it is around the middle of 7th century, and thereafter, that Indian texts begin discussing his ideas, such as the citation of Dharmakīrti verses in the works of Adi Shankara. Dharmakīrti is believed by most scholars to have lived between 600 and 660 CE, but a few place him earlier.

Dharmakīrti is credited with building upon the work of Dignāga, the pioneer of Buddhist logic, and Dharmakīrti has ever since been seen as influential in the Buddhist tradition. His theories became normative in Tibet and are studied to this day as a part of the basic monastic curriculum.

The Tibetan tradition considers that Dharmakīrti was ordained as a Buddhist monk at Nālandā by Dharmapāla. In his writings, we find the statement that no one will understand the value of his work and that his efforts would soon be forgotten.

== Philosophy ==
=== Historical context ===
The Buddhist works such as the Yogacarabhumi-sastra and the Mahāyānasūtrālaṅkāra, composed before the 6th century, on hetuvidyā (logic, dialectics) are unsystematic, whose approach and structure are heresiological, proselytical and apologetic. They aimed were to defeat non-Buddhist opponents (Hinduism, Jainism, Ājīvikism, Charvaka (materialists), and others), defend the ideas of Buddhism, develop a line of arguments that monks could use to convert those who doubted Buddhism and to strengthen the faith of Buddhists who began to develop doubts. Around the middle of the 6th century, possibly to address the polemics of non-Buddhist traditions with their pramana foundations, the Buddhist scholar Dignāga shifted the emphasis from dialectics to more systematic epistemology and logic, retaining the heresiological and apologetic focus. Dharmakīrti followed in Dignāga's footsteps, and is credited with systematic philosophical doctrines on Buddhist epistemology, which Vincent Eltschinger states, has "a full-fledged positive/direct apologetic commitment". Dharmakīrti lived during the collapse of the Gupta Empire, a time of great insecurity for Buddhist institutions. The role of Buddhist logic was seen as an intellectual defense against Hindu philosophical arguments formulated by epistemically sophisticated traditions like the Nyaya school. However, Dharmakīrti and his followers also held that the study of reasoning and its application was an important tool for soteriological ends.

=== Epistemology ===
Buddhist epistemology holds that perception and inference are the means to correct knowledge.

Dharmakīrti's philosophy is based on the need to establish a theory of logical validity and certainty grounded in causality. Following Dignāga's Pramāṇasamuccaya, Dharmakīrti also holds that there are only two instruments of knowledge or 'valid cognition' (pramāṇa): "perception" (pratyaksa) and "inference" (anumāṇa). Perception is a non-conceptual knowing of particulars that is bound by causality, while inference is reasonable, linguistic, and conceptual. In the Pramāṇavārttika Dharmakīrti defines a pramana as a "reliable cognition". What it means for cognition to be reliable has been interpreted in different ways. Following commentators like Dharmottara, who define it as meaning that cognition can lead to the obtaining of one's desired object, some modern scholars such as Jose I. Cabezon have interpreted Dharmakīrti as defending a form of Pragmatism. Tillemans sees him as holding to a weak form of correspondence theory, which holds that to "confirm causal efficacy" (arthakriyāsthiti) is to have a justification that an object of cognition has the causal powers we expected. That justification comes through a certain kind of non-conceptual perception (pratyakṣa) which is said to be an "intrinsical source of knowledge" (svataḥ prāmāṇya) which is ultimately reliable. Dharmakīrti sees a cognition as being valid if it has a causal connection with the object of cognition through an intrinsically valid, un-conceptual perception of the object which does not err regarding its functionality. As Dharmakīrti says: "A pramāṇa is a reliable cognition. [As for] reliability, it consists in [this cognition's] compliance with [the object's capacity to] perform a function" (Pramāṇavārttika 2.1ac).

Dharmakīrti also holds that there were certain extraordinary epistemic warrants, such as the words of the Buddha, who was said to be an authoritative/reliable person (pramāṇapuruṣa) as well as the 'inconceivable' perception of a yogi (yogipratyakṣa). On the role of scriptural authority, Dharmakīrti has a moderate and nuanced position. For Dharmakīrti, scripture (Buddhist or otherwise) is not a genuine and independent means of valid cognition. He held that one should not use scripture to guide one on matters that can be decided by factual and rational means and that one is not to be faulted for rejecting unreasonable parts of the scriptures of one's school. However, scripture is to be relied upon when dealing with "radically inaccessible things", such as the laws of karma and soteriology. However, according to Dharmakīrti scripture is a fallible source of knowledge and has no claim to certainty.

Dharmakīrti made significant contributions to Buddhist epistemology by refining the theory of inference, which addresses a central problem left unresolved by his predecessor, Dignāga. Dharmakīrti's approach ensures that the evidence (e.g. smoke) must always be present when the predicate (e.g. fire) is present, thereby providing a stronger foundation for inferential reasoning.

=== Metaphysics ===
According to Buddhologist Tom Tillemans, Dharmakīrti's ideas constitute a nominalist philosophy which disagrees with the Madhyamaka philosophy, by asserting that some entities are real. Dharmakīrti states that the real is only the momentarily existing particulars (svalakṣaṇa), and any universal (sāmānyalakṣaṇa) is unreal and fiction. Both, however, are objects of knowledge. Particulars are known through perception and universals are known through inference. He criticized the Nyaya theory of universals by arguing that since they have no causal efficacy, there is no rational reason to posit them. What is real must have powers (śakti), fitness (yogyatā), or causal properties which is what individuates a real particular as an object of perception. Dharmakīrti writes "whatever has causal powers (arthakriyāsamartha), that exists (paramārthasat)." This theory of causal properties has been interpreted as a form of trope theory. Svalakṣaṇa are said to be part-less, undivided, and property-less, and yet they impart a causal force which give rise to perceptual cognitions, which are direct reflections of the particulars.

Dharmakīrti's ultimately real (paramārthasat) particulars are contrasted with conventionally real entities (saṃvṛtisat) as part of his presentation of the Buddhist Two truths doctrine. The conventionally real for him are based on linguistic categories, intellectual constructs, and erroneous superimpositions on the flow of reality, such as the idea that universals exist. According to Dharmakīrti, cognitive distortion of the direct perception of particulars occurs during the process of recognition (pratyabhijñāna) and perceptual judgment (niścaya) which arises due to latent tendencies (vāsanā) in the mind left over from past impressions of similar perceptions. These latent dispositions come together into constructed representations of the previously experienced object at the moment of perception, and hence it is an imposed error on the real, a pseudo-perception (pratyakṣābhāsa) which conceals (saṃvṛti) reality while at the same time being practically useful for navigating it. Ignorance (avidyā) for Dharmakīrti is conceptuality, pseudo-perception and superimposition overlaid on the naturally radiant (prabhāsvara) nature of pure perception. By correcting these defilements of perception through mental cultivation as well as using inference to gain "insight born of (rational) reflection" (cintāmayī prajñā) a Buddhist yogi is able to better see the true nature of reality until his perception is fully perfected.

Dharmakīrti, again following Dignāga, also holds that that things as they are in themselves are "ineffable" (avyapadeśya). Language is never about the things in themselves, only about conceptual fiction, hence they are nominalists. Due to this theory, the main issue for Dharmakīrti becomes how to explain that it is possible for our arbitrary and conventional linguistic schemas to refer to perceptual particulars that are ineffable and non-conceptual. To explain this gap between conceptual schema and perceptual content, Dharmakīrti takes up Dignāga's theory of "exclusion" (apoha). Dignāga's view is that "a word talks about entities only as they are qualified by the negation of other things." Dharmakīrti's unique take on this nominalist theory, which underlies his entire system, is to reinterpret it in terms of causal efficacy—arthakriyā (which can also be translated as 'telic function', 'functionality', and 'fulfillment of purpose').

Dharmakīrti developed his philosophical system to defend Buddhist doctrines, so it is no surprise that he developed many of the arguments for rebirth, the Four Noble Truths, the authority of the Buddha, karma, anatta, and compassion as well as attacking Brahminical views such as the authority of the Vedas.

Dharmakīrti also defended the Buddhist theory of momentariness (kṣaṇikatva), which held that dharmas spontaneously perish the moment they arise. Dharmakīrti came up with an argument for the theory which stated that since anything that exists has a causal power, the fact that its causal power is in effect proves it is always changing. For Dharmakīrti, nothing could be a cause while remaining the same, and any permanent thing would be causally inert.

=== Philosophy of mind ===
Dharmakīrti defends Dignāga's theory of consciousness being non-conceptually reflexive (svasamvitti or svasaṃvedana). This is the idea that an act of intentional consciousness is also aware of itself as aware. Consciousness is said to illuminate itself like a lamp that illuminates objects in a room as well as itself. Dharmakīrti also defends the Yogācāra theory of "awareness-only" (vijñaptimātratā), which holds that 'external objects' of perception do not exist. According to Dharmakīrti, an object of cognition is not external or separate from the act of cognition itself. This is because the object is "necessarily experienced simultaneously with the cognition [itself]" (Pramāṇavārttika 3.387). The view that there is a duality (dvaya) between an object (grāhya) and a subjective cognition (grāhaka) arises out of ignorance.

Dharmakīrti's Substantiation of Other Mindstreams (Saṃtānāntarasiddhi) is a treatise on the nature of the mindstream and Buddhist response to the problem of other minds Dharmakīrti held the mindstream to be a beginning-less yet also described the mindstream as a temporal sequence, and that as there are no true beginnings, there are no true endings, hence, the "beginningless time" motif that is frequently used to describe the concept of mindstream.

=== Affiliation ===
There is disagreement among Indian and Tibetan doxographers as to how to categorise Dharmakīrti's thoughts. The Gelug school asserts that he expressed Yogācāra views, most non-Gelug Tibetan commentators assert that he expressed Sautrāntika views and, according to one Tibetan source, several of renowned later Indian Madhyamikas asserted that he expressed Madhyamaka views.

Among modern scholars, some like Tillemans argue that Dharmakīrti represented the Yogācāra school, while Amar Singh argues that he was a Sautrāntika. For Christine Mullikin Keyt, Dharmakīrti represents a "synthesis of two schools of Indian Buddhism, the Sautrantika and the Yogacara." Likewise, Dan Arnold argues that Dharmakīrti's alternating philosophical perspectives of Sautrāntika and Yogācāra views are ultimately compatible and are applied at different levels of his 'sliding scale of analysis.'

There is also a tendency to see Dignāga and Dharmakīrti as founding a new type of Buddhist school or tradition, which is known in Tibetan as "those who follow reasoning" (rigs pa rjes su 'brang ba) and sometimes is known in modern literature as pramāṇavāda.

== Writings and commentaries ==
Dharmakīrti is credited with the following major works:

- Sambandhaparīkṣā and Sambandhaparīkṣāvṛtti (Analysis of Relations)
- Sambandhaparīkṣāvṛtti (Analysis of Relations auto-commentary)
- Pramāṇaviniścaya (Ascertainment of Valid Cognition)
- Pramāṇavārttika-kārika (Commentary on Dignāga's Pramāṇasamuccaya)
- Pramāṇavārttikasvavrtti (auto-commentary on the above text)
- Nyāyabinduprakaraṇa (Drop of Logic)
- Hetubindunāmaprakaraṇa (Drop of Reason)
- Saṃtānāntarasiddhināmaprakaraṇa (Proof of Others' Mindstreams)
- Vādanyāyanāmaprakaraṇa (Reasoning for Debate)

There are various commentaries by later thinkers on Dharmakīrti, the earliest commentators being the Indian scholars Devendrabuddhi (ca. 675 CE.) and Sakyabuddhi (ca. 700 C.E.). Other Indian commentators include Karṇakagomin, Prajñākaragupta, Manorathanandin, Ravigupta and Śaṅkaranandana.

He was extremely influential in Tibet, where Phya pa Chos kyi Seng ge (1182-1251) wrote the first summary of his works, called "Clearing of Mental Obscuration with Respect to the Seven Treatises on Valid Cognition" (tshad ma sde bdun yid gi mun sel). Sakya Pandita wrote the "Treasure on the Science of Valid Cognition" (tshad ma rigs gter) and interpreted Dharmakīrti as an anti-realist against Phya pa's realism. These two main interpretations of Dharmakīrti became the foundation for most debates in Tibetan epistemology.

== See also ==
- Dignāga
- Hetucakra
- Trairūpya
- Buddhist logic
- Pramana
- Buddhist atomism
- Epistemology
- William of Ockham

== Bibliography ==
- Dreyfus, Georges (1997). Recognizing Reality: Dharmakīrti's Philosophy and Its Tibetan Interpretations. New York: State University of New York Press. ISBN 978-0-7914-3098-9. extensive discussion of the Dharmakirti's Tibetan reception
- Dunne, John D. (2004). Foundations of Dharmakīrti's Philosophy. Somerville, Mass.: Wisdom Publications. ISBN 978-0-86171-184-0.
- Eltschinger, Vincent (2010). "Dharmakīrti: Revue internationale de philosophie". Buddhist Philosophy. 2010.3 (253): 397–440.
- Pecchia, C. (ed., with the assistance of Pierce P.). (2015). Dharmakīrti on the Cessation of Suffering. A Critical Edition with Translation and Comments of Manorathanandin's Vṛtti and Vibhūticandraʼs Glosses on Pramāṇavārttika II.190-216. Leiden, Brill.
- Shcherbatskoy, Fyodor (1932) Buddhist Logic, introduced the West to Buddhist logic, and more specifically to Dignaga. Although pioneering, this work is now regarded as outdated by some Buddhist scholars. — David Loy complains about viewing Buddhist philosophy "through the categories of another system – Stcherbatsky's Kant, Murti's Vedānta, Gudmundsen's Wittgenstein – which (as with earlier interpretations of nirvāṇa) reveals more about the interpreter than the interpreted." (Loy, David (1984). "How not to criticize Nāgārjuna". Philosophy East and West. 34 (4): 437–445. doi:10.2307/1399177. JSTOR 1399177.).
- Tillemans, T. J. F. (1999). Scripture, Logic, Language: Essays on Dharmakirti and His Tibetan Successors. Somerville, Mass.: Wisdom Publications. ISBN 978-0-86171-156-7.
