= Śaṅkaranandana =

9th/10th century Buddhist philosopher

Śaṅkaranandana (fl. c. 9th or 10th century), (Tibetan: Bde byed dga’ ba) was a Mahayana Buddhist philosopher, and a brahmin lay devotee (upāsaka) active in Kashmir in the epistemological (pramana) tradition of Dignaga and Dharmakīrti. He was quite influential in both Kashmir and Tibet, and became known as "the second Dharmakīrti," and “the Great Brahmin.”

Śaṅkaranandana is cited by both Kashmiri Shaiva authors like Abhinavagupta and by Tibetan Buddhist authors and translators. Vincent Eltschinger states that he was "the main interlocutor of the Saiva Pratyabhijña school and as one of the most influential thinkers among the early generations of Tibetan philosophers." His influence on Kashmir Shaiva thinkers was such that Abhinavagupta even calls Śaṅkaranandana his "guru" in Mālinīvijayavārttika and speaks of Śaṅkaranandana's enlightenment in another text (the interpretation of this is disputed however). This led some modern scholars to speculate whether Śaṅkaranandana was a Shaiva at some point who later converted to Buddhism. This thesis has not been proven however. Tāranātha’s History does state that he was a non-Buddhist brahmin who converted after seeing Manjusri in a dream. Whatever the case, all of Śaṅkaranandana's extant works are of a Buddhist persuasion.

Like other thinkers in his tradition, Śaṅkaranandana defended the idealistic Yogacara theory of "consciousness only" or Vijñānavāda through the logical refutation of any external objects of cognition. Thus, according to Eltschinger, for Śaṅkaranandana "realistic or pluralistic accounts of reality rely on latent tendencies and are ultimately erroneous". For Śaṅkaranandana, the ultimate view is the non-dual view (advaya-darsana) in which a Buddha perceives only non-dual consciousness free of subject-object distinctions and of all transformations of thought produced by latent tendencies.

== Work ==
Śaṅkaranandana wrote at least 17 works on logic and epistemology. Four of his works have survived in Tibetan translation, and others have survived in Sanskrit manuscripts, most incomplete or fragmentary.

According to Eltschinger his magnum opus was most likely the Prajñālaṅkāra (“Ornament of Wisdom”), which was "a systematic exposition of the Yogācāra Buddhist doctrine of mind-only (vijñaptimātratā)."

Among his other writings are four commentaries on Dharmakīrti's texts, including the Pramāṇavārttikaṭīkā, which comments on Dharmakīrti's Pramāṇavārttikasvavṛtti.

One of his surviving texts, the Īśvarāpākaraṇa-saṅkṣepa (Summary of a refutation of Īśvarā), a refutation of the Hindu concept of a creator deity, has been translated by into German in Helmut Krasser's habilitation study.

Other works include:

- Sambandhaparīkṣānusāra (translated by Parahita-bhadra and Dga’ ba’i rdo rje into Tibetan)
- Apohasiddhi translated by Manoratha and Rngog Blo ldan shes rab
- Vādanyāya (a commentary on a work by Dharmakīrti)
- Pratibandhasiddhikārikā translated by Bhavyarāja and Rngog Blo ldan shes rab
- Laghupratibandhasiddhikārikā (“Short Proof of the Connection”)
- Sūkṣmaprāmāṇya-, Madhyaprāmāṇya-, and Bṛhatprāmāṇya kārikās (“Short/Middle/Extensive versions of "Examination of Valid Cognition")
- Anyāpohasiddhikārikā (“Proof of Other-Exclusion”)
- Dharmālaṅkāra (“Ornament of the Dharma”)
- Sarvajñasiddhikārikā (“Proof of all-knowledge”)
- Svalpasarvajñasiddhikārikā (also known as Sarvajñasiddhisaṅkṣepa, “Summary of the Proof of all-knowledge”),
- Saṅkṣipteśvarāpākaraṇa (also known as Īśvarāpākaraṇasaṅkṣepa, “Summary of the Refutation of [a Creator] God”)
- Āgamasiddhi (“Proof of [the Human Origin of Authoritative] Scripture”)

== See also ==
- Pramana
- Epistemology
- Dharmakirti
