= Richard Hayes (professor) =

Professor of Buddhist philosophy

Richard Hayes (aka Dharmacārī Dayāmati) (born 1945) is an Emeritus professor of Buddhist philosophy at the University of New Mexico. He received his Ph.D. in Sanskrit and Indian studies from the University of Toronto in 1982. Hayes moved to Canada in 1967 in order to avoid being drafted for the Vietnam War.

Hayes is a noted scholar in the field of Buddhist Sanskrit, specializing in the study of Dharmakīrti and Dignāga.

Hayes was formerly Associate Professor of religious studies at McGill University in Canada. He joined the University of New Mexico in the fall of 2003 and retired in 2013.

Hayes was a co-founder, moderator, and contributor to the online discussion group Buddha-L. The group included scholars and amateurs and hosted debates.

As well as teaching Buddhism and Sanskrit, Hayes is himself a Buddhist and a Quaker. In a brief blog bio he says he was "Initiated as a dharmachari with the name Dayāmati into the Triratna Buddhist Order on January 26, 2000. I am also a member of Albuquerque Monthly Meeting of the Religious Society of Friends (Quakers)." Hayes is a noted essayist (Land of No Buddha) and blogger (New City of Friends, Out of a Living Silence) of considerable wit and clarity. He has expressed vehement political opinions, and been critical in particular of Republican politicians.

== Books ==
- Hayes, R. P. (1988). Dignāga on the Interpretation of Signs (Studies of Classical India). Springer. ISBN 90-277-2667-1.
- Hayes, Richard P. (1998). Land of No Buddha: Reflections of a Sceptical Buddhist. Birmingham: Windhorse Publications. ISBN 1-899579-12-5.
- Hayes, Richard P.; Hori, Victor Sogen; Shields, James Mark (2002). Teaching Buddhism in the West: From the Wheel to the Web. Curzon Critical Studies in Buddhism. Routledge Curzon. ISBN 0-7007-1556-8.
