= Apoha =

Buddhist epistemological theory

Apoha (Sanskrit: अपोह) is a Buddhist epistemological theory first proposed by the philosopher Dignāga (c. 480 – c. 540 CE) in his seminal text Pramāṇasamuccaya. The theory went on to be significantly elaborated upon and extended by Dignāga's successor Dharmakīrti (6th or 7th century CE). Buddhist philosophers of the logico-epistemological school, of which Dignāga and Dharmakīrti were the most influential, were nominalists, i.e., they held the position that the world is composed of unique particulars and that the concepts in terms of which we think and communicate have no counterpart in reality but are mere mental impositions. Our categories of thought and language are thus, according to the Buddhists, purely subjective – the result of our past karmic impressions that obscure from us the true nature of reality.

Apoha theory was proposed to provide an explanation for how, in the absence of objectively existent universals, we are able to form concepts and effectively use them to communicate and achieve practical ends. Dignāga defined apoha as a theory of classification based on exclusion. He said that a category such as 'cow' is arrived at not by the inclusion of all objects we would, based on some criteria, identify as cows, but by the exclusion of all objects we would identify as 'non-cows.' Concepts thus involve a double negation - the category of 'cow' is, in fact, the category of all 'not non-cows.' Since a negation or an absence cannot, according to the Buddhists, be objectively real (since absences are not caused and have no causal efficacy), this shows that concepts, though referring to a class of particulars, have no basis in reality.

== Etymology ==
According to the Monier-Williams Sanskrit dictionary, the word apoha literally means 'pushing away' or 'removing.' In the context of this epistemological theory, a closer meaning would be 'excluding.' Another possible meaning, given in the DDSA Practical Sanskrit Dictionary, comes from apoha being thought of as the compound of apa and ūha. Ūha means reasoning, while apa is a prefix often used to indicate opposition. So, apoha could be taken to mean reverse or negative reasoning.

== Background ==
The apoha theory is an attempt to bridge the gap between what the Buddhists saw as the ontologically dichotomous entities of the particular (svalakṣaṇa) and the universal (sāmānyalakṣaṇa). A particular is, according to the Buddhists of the logico-epistemological school, a real object that is composed of an infinite number of unique characteristics and can, therefore, never be adequately represented through concepts or words. Universals, conversely, are abstract categories of particulars that we construct mentally to derive knowledge about the conventional world through inference and verbal communication; they have no ontological reality but are purely subjective. Since particulars are infinitely constituted and unrepresentable, universals are not definable in terms of them; they can only be defined in negative terms, i.e., through the exclusion of what they are not.

From the perspective of language, the function of a word is to act as the signifier of a referent. However, the individual instance of the utterance of a word and the particular object it refers to cannot constitute a sign function by themselves since their concomitance is unrepeatable - they have never been observed together in the past, nor will they be in the future. Hence, their relationship is not learnable or something that can constitute knowledge. But what, then, is a word's invariable connection with its signified object, which makes it a source of knowledge? While other philosophical schools of Dignāga's time sought to explain this connection by positing objectively existent universals that inhere in particulars and which are the referents of words, Dignāga's rejection of the reality of universals called for an alternative explanation.

== Dignāga's Top-Down Approach ==
Dignāga attempts to solve this problem by defining words and concepts not as affirmative in nature but as negative. He takes the two established inductive categories of observation used in Indian philosophy - concordance (anvaya) and difference (vyatireka) - to elaborate. The meaning of a word cannot be inducted through anvaya alone as if we are trying to understand the meaning of the word 'tree', we cannot possibly do so through observing all the particular objects that concord with that category, as they are infinite in number. Further, since all the objects are unique particulars, it is not possible to determine which object falls in the category 'tree' if we have not previously ascribed the label to it. Therefore, forming a positive category corresponding to a word or concept is impossible. However, Dignāga believes that we can establish a connection between the word tree and the category of particulars it refers to by reference to the fact that the word does not apply to non-trees i.e. to objects in which the particular distinctive features of a 'tree' are absent. A word thus functions as a "limitation operator", delimiting the boundary between its referents and non-referents.

An opponent might raise the objection, if anvaya cannot establish the category as it would involve the inclusion of an infinite number of instances, does vyatireka not involve the exclusion of an infinite number of instances? Dignāga explains that the exclusion does not happen at the individual level but collectively, in accordance with the general theory of exclusion. The absence of the defining feature of the category demarcates the collection of all objects that lack this feature; however, it does not say anything specific about the nature of those objects. In particular, it does not ascribe any common property to the particulars in question, which would be impossible as no such common property exists. Thus, 'non-A' denotes in a general form the absence of the distinctive feature of A, and so 'not non-A' denotes all particulars that would fall into category A.

In order to show how thinking of category A as being 'not non-A' is not a mere truism that depends on a prior understanding of A, the two negations in the expression 'not non-A' have been explained to be different in nature. While the 'non' negates the noun A, i.e., it is nominally bound, the 'not' negates the verb 'is' in the sentence 'x is not non-A' (where x is an instance of type A), i.e., it is verbally bound. In the case of the verbally bound negation, the classical logical Law of Excluded Middle holds, i.e., either x is A, or x is not A, for all x. On the other hand, in the case of the nominally bound negation, 'x is A' and 'x is non-A' are two incompatible statements, but they are not contradictory; a third possibility, that x is neither A, nor non-A, exists. Because of this difference in the type of the two negations, 'x is not non-A' does not simply reduce to 'x is A.'

== Dharmakīrti's Bottom-Up Approach ==
A few decades after Dignāga, the philosopher Dharmakīrti significantly revised apoha theory. While Dignāga's account was a 'top-down' approach which sought to show what characteristics of our concepts allow them to refer to multiple particulars without possessing any ontological reality, Dharmakīrti took a 'bottom-up' approach in which he showed how particulars give rise to concepts through a causal chain. This involves particulars generating perceptual images in the mind of the observer, which, due to the constraints imposed by the perceptual apparatus of the observer, they judge to be of the same kind. Thus, the particulars, though completely distinct from one another, cause the same effect on the observer – not due to any shared property of the particulars in question, but due to the nature of the perceptual mechanism of the perceiver, which is seen as conditioned by their karma, and therefore distortionary. Any shared property among the particulars is thus denied, while still allowing for them to be conceptualised as belonging to the same class by the observer.

Thus, for Dharmakīrti, the basis for our categorisation of a particular into a class of objects is not some property inherent to that particular, but the capacity of the particular to have a certain effect on us. To illustrate this point, he gives the example of a collection of antipyretic herbs, all of which reduce fever when consumed. However, the internal composition and properties of these herbs are completely different from each other, as are the mechanisms by which they act on the body of the patient—and yet, they all have the same desired effect.

=== Criticisms ===
Thinkers from the ancient Indian realist schools, such as the Mimamsa, Vishishtadvaita, Dvaita, Nyaya, Yoga, Samkhya, Sauntrantika, Jain, Vaisesika, and others heavily criticized idealist ideas such as Apoha, and composed refutations of these positions.
