= Hetucakra =

Sanskrit text on logic

Hetucakra or Wheel of Reasons is a Sanskrit text on logic written by Dignaga (c 480–540 CE). It concerns the application of his 'three modes’ (trairūpya), conditions or aspects of the middle term called hetu ("reason" for a conclusion) or linga ("mark", "sign" of a sound argument) in a valid inference within the Indian logico-epistemic tradition, sometimes referred to as Buddhist logic.

== Anacker's assessment ==
Anacker (2005: p. 34), in introducing his English rendering of the "Method for Argumentation (Vāda-vidhi)" of Vasubandhu (fl. 4th century)—a text composed in Sanskrit which is now only extant in a reconstructed composite extracted from Tibetan works, collated by Frauwallner (1957)—holds that:

Vasubandhu's criteria for a valid inference-schema are concise and precise, and there is nothing essential omitted. Dignāga's 'wheel of justifications' (hetu-cakra), sometimes held to be the first complete Indian formulation of what constitutes the validity and invalidity of an argument, is in fact nothing of the kind: it is a pedagogic device mapping out in detail what Vasubandhu's criteria already presuppose.

== Dignaga's formulation ==
Dignaga formulated the 'three modes’ (trairūpya) which are three conditions required for a logical ‘sign’ or ‘mark’ (linga), which to fulfill in order to establish the 'valid cognition' (pramana) of an 'inference' (anumana):

1. It should be present in the case or object under consideration, the ‘subject-locus’ (pakṣa)
2. It should be present in a ‘similar case’ or a homologue (sapakṣa)
3. It should not be present in any ‘dissimilar case’ or heterologue (vipakṣa)

When a ‘sign’ or ‘mark’ (linga) is identified, there are three possibilities: the sign may be present in all, some, or none of the sapakṣas. Similarly, the sign may be present in all, some or none of the vipakṣas. To identify a sign, by convention we accept the first condition as being satisfied.

=== Wheel of Reasons ===
Combining these, Dignaga constructed his ‘Wheel of Reasons’ (Hetucakra) with nine distinct possibilities, which may be tabulated as follows (adapted from Matilal, 1998: p. 9):

Hetucakra
1: + sapakṣa, + vipakṣa	2: + sapakṣa, – vipakṣa	3: + sapakṣa, ± vipakṣa
4: – sapakṣa, + vipakṣa	5: – sapakṣa, – vipakṣa	6: – sapakṣa, ± vipakṣa
7: ± sapakṣa, + vipakṣa	8: ± sapakṣa, – vipakṣa	9: ± sapakṣa, ± vipakṣa
Key: + = all, ± = some, -- = none

=== Interpretation ===
Of the nine possibilities within the cakra or 'wheel', Dignaga asserted that only two are illustrative of sound inference, that is they meet all three conditions, namely Numbers 2 and 8: either "+ sapakṣa & − vipakṣa" or "± sapakṣa & − vipakṣa" would fulfill the required conditions. Dignaga is insistent that at least one sapaksa must have the positive sign. Number 5 is not a case of sound inference as this is a pseudo-sign for although it satisfies the two conditions 1 and 3, it does not fulfill condition 2.

=== Pseudo-signs ===
Dignaga required all three conditions to be met in order to establish valid cognition. The second row does not satisfy condition 2 and hence none of Numbers 4, 5, and 6 are logical signs; they are pseudo-signs. Numbers 4 and 6 are called “contradictory” pseudo-signs—an improvement upon the old Nyāya Sūtras definition of contradictory. The middle one, Number 5, is called “uniquely deviating” (asādhāraṇa), perhaps for the reason that this sign becomes a unique sign of the paksa itself, and is not found anywhere else. In Dignaga's system, this sign cannot be a sign for anything else, it can only point to itself reflexively or to its own locus. Numbers 1, 3, 7, and 9 are also pseudo-signs. They are called the “deviating” signs, for in each case the sign occurs in some vipaksa or other, although each fulfills the second condition. This shows that, at least in Dignaga's own view, the second condition (when it is combined with the first) gives only a necessary condition for being an adequate sign, not a sufficient one. In other words, Dignaga intended all three conditions jointly to formulate a sufficient condition.
