= Trairūpya =

Trairūpya (Sanskrit; English: "the triple-character of inferential sign") is a conceptual tool of Buddhist logic. The Trairūpya, ‘three conditions’, is often accredited to Dignaga (c. 480-540 CE) though is now understood to have originated with his teacher Vasubandhu (fl. 4th century) in the Vāda-vidhi, post-reconstruction of this work by Frauwallner (1957).

Trairūpya is a logical argument that contains three constituents which a logical ‘sign’ or ‘mark’ (linga) must fulfill to be 'valid source of knowledge' (pramana):

1. It should be present in the case or object under consideration, the ‘subject-locus' (pakṣa)
2. It should be present in a ‘similar case’ or a homologue (sapakṣa)
3. It should not be present in any ‘dissimilar case’ or heterologue (vipakṣa)

When a ‘sign’ or ‘mark’ (linga) is identified, there are three possibilities: the sign may be present in all, some, or none of the sapakṣas. Likewise, the sign may be present in all, some or none of the vipakṣas. To identify a sign, we have to assume that it is present in the pakṣa, however; that is the first condition is already satisfied. Combining these, Dignaga constructed his ‘Wheel of Reason’ (Sanskrit: Hetucakra).
