= Dignāga =

Indian Buddhist philosopher and logician (c.480–c.540)

Personal life
- Born: c. 470/480 CE Near Kanchi
- Died: c. 530/540CE
- Education: Nalanda

Religious life
- Religion: Buddhism
- School: Mahayana

Senior posting
- Students: Dharmapala of Nalanda

Dignāga (also known as Diṅnāga, c. 470/480 – c. 530/540 CE) was an Indian Buddhist philosopher and logician. He is credited as one of the Buddhist founders of Indian logic (hetu vidyā) and atomism. Dignāga's work laid the groundwork for the development of deductive logic in India and created the first system of Buddhist logic and epistemology (pramāṇa).

According to Georges B. Dreyfus, his philosophical school brought about an Indian "epistemological turn" and became the "standard formulation of Buddhist logic and epistemology in India and Tibet." Dignāga's thought influenced later Buddhist philosophers like Dharmakīrti and also Hindu thinkers of the Nyāya school. Dignāga's epistemology accepted only "perception" (pratyaksa) and "inference" (anumāṇa) as valid instruments of knowledge and introduced the widely influential theory of "exclusion" (apoha) to explain linguistic meaning. His work on language, inferential reasoning and perception were also widely influential among later Indian philosophers. According to Richard P. Hayes "some familiarity with Dinnaga's arguments and conclusions is indispensable for anyone who wishes to understand the historical development of Indian thought."

== Life ==
Little is known about Dignāga's life. According to Taranatha, Dignāga was born to a Brahmin family near the city of Kanchi in around 470 or 480 CE and was ordained into the Vātsīputrīya order at an early age by a monk named Nāgadatta. Xuanzang states that Dignāga was active for a period in the "Andhra country". At some point in his life, Dignāga became associated with the monastery of Nalanda.

== Philosophy ==
Buddhist epistemology holds that perception and inference are the means to correct knowledge.

Dignāga's mature philosophy is expounded in his magnum opus, the Pramāṇa-samuccaya. In chapter one, Dignāga explains his epistemology which holds that there are only two 'instruments of knowledge' or 'valid cognitions' (pramāṇa); "perception" or "sensation" (pratyakṣa) and "inference" or "reasoning" (anumāna). In chapter one, Dignāga writes:

Sensation and reasoning are the only two means of acquiring knowledge, because two attributes are knowable; there is no knowable object other than the peculiar and the general attribute. I shall show that sensation has the peculiar attribute as its subject matter, while reasoning has the general attribute as its subject matter.

Perception is a non-conceptual knowing of particulars which is bound by causality, while inference is reasonable, linguistic and conceptual. This conservative epistemic theory was in contrast to the Nyāya school who accepted other means of knowledge such as upamāna (comparison and analogy).

=== Pratyakṣa ===
Pratyakṣa is a kind of awareness that acquires information about particulars, and is immediately present to one of the senses. This is the topic of the first chapter of the Pramāṇa-samuccaya. For Dignāga, perception is pre-verbal, pre-conceptual and unstructured sense data. In chapter two of the Pramāṇa-samuccaya he writes:

Sensation is devoid of structure. That cognition in which there is no structure is sensation. What kind of thing is this so-called structure? Attaching a name, a universal and so forth.

According to Dignāga our mind always takes raw sense data or particulars and interprets them or groups them together in more complex ways, compares them to past experiences, gives them names to classify them based on general attributes (samanyalaksana) and so forth. This process he terms kalpana (arranging, structuring). This cognitive process is already different from sensation, which is a simple cognition based only on the immediately present. Thus pratyakṣa is only awareness of particular sense data such as a patch of green color and the sensation of hardness, never awareness of a macroscopic object such an apple which is always a higher level synthesis. For Dignāga, sensation is also inerrant, it cannot "stray" because it is the most basic and simple phenomenon of experience or as he puts it:

"it is impossible too for the object of awareness itself to be errant, for errancy is only the content of misinterpretation by the mind."

Also, for Dignāga, pratyakṣa is mostly phenomenalist and is not dependent on the existence of an external world. It is also inexpressible and private.

=== Anumāṇa ===
Anumāṇa (inference or reasoning) for Dignāga is a type of cognition which is only aware of general attributes, and is constructed out of simpler sensations. Inference can also be communicated through linguistic conventions.

A central issue which concerned Dignāga was the interpretation of signs (linga) or the evidence (hetu) which led one to an inference about states of affairs; such as how smoke can lead one to infer that there is a fire. This topic of svārthānumāna (reasoning, literally "inference for oneself") is the subject of chapter two of the Pramāṇa-samuccaya while the topic of the third chapter is about demonstration (parārthānumāna, literally "inference for others"), that is, how one communicates one's inferences through proper argument.

According to Richard Hayes, in Dignāga's system, to obtain knowledge that a property (the "inferable property", sadhya) is inherent in a "subject of inference" (paksa) it must be derived through an inferential sign (linga). For this to occur, the following must be true:

1. The inferential sign must be a property of the subject of the inference. That is, there exists in the subject of inference a property, which is different from the inferable property and which is furthermore evident to the person drawing the inference; this second property may serve as an inferential sign in case it has two further characteristics.
2. The inferential sign must be known to occur in at least one locus, other than the subject of inference, in which the inferable property occurs.
3. The inferential sign must not be known to occur in any other loci in which the inferable property is absent.

Richard Hayes interprets these criteria as overly strict and this is because he sees Dignāga's system as one of rational skepticism. Dignāga's epistemology, argues Hayes, is a way to express and practice the traditional Buddhist injunction to not become attached to views and opinions. According to Hayes, for Dignāga, the role of logic is:

to counter dogmatism and prejudice. As a weapon in the battle against prejudice that rages in every mind that seeks wisdom—in minds of the vast majority of people who do not seek wisdom, prejudice simply takes full control without a contest-there is nothing as powerful as the kind of reason that lies at the heart of Dignaga's system of logic. For it should be clear that very few of our judgments in ordinary life pass the standards set by the three characteristics of legitimate' evidence. Taken in its strictest interpretation, none of the judgments of any but a fully omniscient being passes. And, since there is no evidence that there exist any fully omniscient beings, the best available working hypothesis is that no one's thinking is immune from errors that require revision in the face of newly discovered realities.

=== Apohavada and language ===
Dignāga considered the interpretation of conventional and symbolic signs such as the words and sentences of human language to be no more than special or conventional instances of the general principles of inference or anumana. He takes up several issues relating to language and its relationship to inference in the fifth chapter of his Pramāṇa-samuccaya.

During Dignāga's time, the orthodox Indian Nyāya school and also Hindu Sanskrit grammarians (such as Bhartṛhari) had discussed issues of epistemology and language respectively, but their theories generally accepted the concept of universals which was rejected by most Buddhist philosophers. Influenced by the work of these thinkers as well as by Buddhist philosophers of the Sautrantika school who rejected Hindu theories of universals in favor of nominalism (prajñapti), Dignāga developed his own Buddhist theory of language and meaning based on the concept of "apoha" (exclusion). Hattori Masaaki explains the doctrine thus:

a word indicates an object merely through the exclusion of other objects (anyapoha, -vyavrtti). For example, the word "cow" simply means that the object is not a non-cow. As such, a word cannot denote anything real, whether it be an individual (vyakti), a universal (jati), or any other thing. The apprehension of an object by means of the exclusion of other objects is nothing but an inference.

== Works ==
As noted by Hayes, the difficulty in studying the highly terse works of Dignāga is considerable, because none of them have survived in the original Sanskrit and the Tibetan and Chinese translations which do survive show signs of having been done by translators who were not completely certain of the meaning of the work. This difficulty has also led scholars to read Dignāga through the lens of later authors such as Dharmakīrti and their Indian and Tibetan interpreters as well as their Hindu Nyāya opponents. Because of this tendency in scholarship, ideas which are actually innovations of Dharmakīrti and later authors have often been associated with Dignāga by scholars such as Fyodor Shcherbatskoy and S. Mookerjee, even though these thinkers often differ.

=== Pramāṇa-samuccaya ===
Dignāga's magnum opus, the Compendium of Epistemology (Derge Kanjur no. 4203) and its auto-commentary (Pramāṇasamuccayavṛtti), examined perception, language and inferential reasoning. It presents perception as a bare cognition, devoid of conceptualization and sees language as useful fictions created through a process of exclusion (apoha).

The work has six chapters. Chapter one is on perception (pratyakṣa), chapter two on inference for one's self (svārthānumāna), chapter three on inference for others (parārthānumāna), chapter four discusses reason and examples (hētu-dṛṣṭāna), chapter five deals with apoha and chapter six deals with analogy (jāti).

This work exists in two Tibetan translations. The Sanskrit text was initially thought to be lost by modern scholars, but then a manuscript of the commentary by Jinendrabuddhi was discovered. Modern scholars are currently working to extract and reconstruct the Sanskrit text of the Pramāṇasamuccaya from the commentary in which it is embedded.

Kumarila Bhatta, in his Shlokavartika, responds to Dignāga's criticism of Mimamsa Sutra 1.1.4.

=== List of other known works ===
His other surviving works on reasoning and epistemology include:

- Alambana-parīkṣā (Examination of the Object of Cognition, Derge Kanjur no. 4205) and its auto commentary (Ālambanaparīkṣāvṛtti). This work seeks to prove that ālambanas, the objects of perception, are not real and that consciousness alone is real.
- Hetucakraḍamaru (The Reason Wheel Drum), considered his first work on formal logic. It may be regarded as a bridge between the older doctrine of trairūpya and Dignāga's own later theory of vyapti which is a concept related to the Western notion of implication.
- *Hetvābhāsamukha (Introduction to Fallacious Reasoning)
- Nyāya-mukha (Introduction to Logic), Taisho no. 1628 translated by Xuanzang and T. 1629 by Yijing
- *Sāmānyalakṣaṇaparīkṣā (Examination of General Characteristics), i.e. Guanzongxiang lun (觀總相論)
- Trikāla-parikṣa (Examination of the three times)
- *Upādāyaprajñaptiprakaraṇa or *Prajñaptihetusaṃgrahaśāstra (only available in Chinese as Qushishishe lun 取事施設論)

He also wrote other works of a more religious or scriptural nature:

- Samantabhadracaryāpraṇidhānārthasaṃgraha (Derge Kanjur no. 4012) - a commentary on the Samantabhadracaryāpraṇidhāna, part of the Gaṇḍavyūhasūtra.
- Abhidharmakośamarmapradīpa (Derge no. 4095) – a condensed summary of Vasubandhu's seminal work the Abhidharmakośa
- Āryamañjughoṣastotra (Tibetan: Ḥphags-pa ḥjam-paḥi-dbyans-kyibstod-pa, Derge no. 2712)
- Prajñāpāramitāpiṇḍārtha (Summary of the Perfection of Wisdom, Derge 3809) - a summary of the Mahayana Aṣṭasāhasrikaprajñāpāramitā, survives in Tibetan and Sanskrit.
- Guṇaparyantastotraṭīkā (Tibetan: Yon-tam mthaḥ-yas-par bstod-paḥi ḥgrelpa, Derge no. 1156) - a commentary on the Guṇaparyantastotra of Ratnadāsa
- Miśraka-stotra (Mixed Hymn, Tibetan: Spel-mar bstod-pa shes-bya-ba, Derge no. 1150), it has also been ascribed to a different author: Mātṛceṭa
- Yogāvatāra (Introduction to Yoga, Tibetan: Rnal-ḥbyor-la ḥjug-pa, Derge no. 4074) - a work on yoga from the perspective of mind-only
- Hastavālaprakaraṇa (Derge no. 3844 and 3848) it has been wrongly ascribed to Āryadeva;

There are also several works said to be by Dignaga that are now lost:

- Dvādaśaśatikā
- *Vaiśeṣikaparīkṣā (Examination of Vaiśeṣika)
- Vādavidhānaṭīkā - Commentary on Vasubandhu's Vādavidhi
- Nyāyaparīkṣā (Examination of Logic)
- *Sāṅkhyaparīkṣā (Examination of Samkhya)
- Hetumukha (Introduction to Reasoning)
- Sāmānyaparīkṣā (Examination of Generality), either lost or the same as *Sāmānyalakṣaṇaparīkṣā

== Tradition and influence ==
Dignāga founded a tradition of Buddhist epistemology and reasoning, and this school is sometimes called the "School of Dignāga" or "The school of Dinnāga and Dharmakīrti" (due to the strong influence of Dharmakīrti as well). In Tibetan it is often called "those who follow reasoning" (Tibetan: rigs pa rjes su 'brang ba); in modern literature it is sometimes known by the Sanskrit 'pramāṇavāda', often translated as "the Epistemological School." Many of the figures in these were commentators on the works of Dignāga and Dharmakīrti, but some of them also wrote original works and developed the tradition in new directions.

The work of this tradition also went on to influence the Buddhist Madhyamaka school, through the work of figures like Bhāvaviveka (c. 500 – c. 578), Jñanagarbha (700-760), and Śāntarakṣita (725–788). These thinkers attempted to adopt the logical and epistemological insights of Dignāga and Dharmakīrti to defend the tenets of the Madhyamaka school.

Dignāga's tradition of logic and epistemology continued in Tibet, where it was expanded by thinkers such as Cha-ba (1182–1251) and Sakya Pandita (1182–1251).

Dignāga also influenced non-Buddhist Sanskrit thinkers. According to Lawrence J. McCrea, and Parimal G. Patil, Dignāga set in motion an "epistemic turn" in Indian philosophy. After Dignāga, most Indian philosophers were now expected to defend their views by using a fully developed epistemological theory (which they also had to defend).

== See also ==
- Hetucakra
- Trairūpya
- Buddhist logic
- Critical Buddhism
