= Tom Tillemans =

Dutch-Canadian professor based in Switzerland (born 1950)

T. J. F. (Tom) Tillemans (born Haarlem, December 21, 1950) is a Dutch-Canadian Buddhologist, Indologist and Tibetologist. Since 1992, Tillemans has been Professor of Buddhology in the Faculty of Oriental Languages and Civilizations at the University of Lausanne in Switzerland.

Tom Tillemans received his bachelor's degree at the University of British Columbia in Vancouver, British Columbia, Canada. His masters, in Sanskrit, Chinese and philosophy, he received at the Universities of Lausanne and Geneva and his doctorate in Buddhist Studies in Lausanne.

After his studies he did research at Hiroshima University in Japan and was invited to several universities as a visiting professor. In addition to his professorship in Lausanne as head of the department of Oriental Studies and Associate Dean for the Faculty of Arts Tillemans does research on Indian and Tibetan Buddhist logic and epistemology, Madhyamaka philosophy, indigenous Tibetan literature, and Tibetan grammar and poetry.

During the spring semester 2010, Tillemans is giving a lecture entitled "L'éthique dans la pensée bouddhique" at the University of Lausanne.

== Works ==
=== Books ===
- Tillemans, T.J.F. (1989) Agents and actions in classical Tibetan: The indigenous grammarians on bdag and gzhan and bya byed las gsum. Arbeitskreis für Tibetische und Buddhistische Studien, Universiteit Wenen
- Tillemans, T.J.F. & Nag-dbang-bstan-dar (1993). Persons of Authority: The Ston Pa Tshad - A Tibetan Work on the Central Religious Questions in Buddhist Epistemology. Coronet Books Inc, ISBN 978-3-515-05900-8
- Tillemans, T.J.F. (1999). Scripture, Logic, Language: Volume I: Essays on Dharmakirti and His Tibetan Successors Studies in Indian and Tibetan Buddhism. Wisdom Publications, ISBN 978-0-86171-156-7
- Tillemans, T.J.F. (2008). Materials for the Study of Aryadeva, Dharmapala and Chandrakirti. Motilal Banarsidass, India ISBN 978-81-208-3112-4
- Dharmakīrti’s Pramāṇavārttika. An annotated translation of the fourth chapter (parārthānumāna). Volume 1 (k. 1-148). Verlag der Oesterreichischen Akademie der Wissenschaften, Vienna 2000.

=== Articles ===
- Tillemans, T.J.F. (1982). «The 'Neither One nor Many' Argument for śūnyatā and its Tibetan Interpretations: Background Information and Source Materials», Études de Lettres 3, 1982, University of Lausanne, pp. 103–128.
- Tillemans, T.J.F. (1983). «The 'Neither One nor Many' Argument for śūnyatā and its Tibetan Interpretations», in E. Steinkellner et H. Tauscher (eds.), Contributions on Tibetan and Buddhist Religion and Philosophy. Wiener Studien zur Tibetologie und Buddhismuskunde, Heft 11. Vienne : Arbeitskreis für Tibetische und Buddhistische Studien Universität Wien, 1983, pp. 305–320.
- Tillemans, T.J.F. (1984a). «On a Recent Work on Tibetan Buddhist Epistemology», Asiatische Studien/Études Asiatiques, XXXVIII, 1, Revue de la Société Suisse-Asie, P. Lang, Berne, 1984, pp. 59–66.
- Tillemans, T.J.F. (1984b). «Sur le parārthānumāna en logique bouddhique», Asiatische Studien/Études Asiatiques, XXXVIII, 2, Berne, 1984, pp. 73–99.
- Tillemans, T.J.F. (1984c). «Two Tibetan Texts on the 'Neither One nor Many' Argument for śūnyatā», Journal of Indian Philosophy 12, Dordrecht, Pays-Bas, Kluwer Academic Publishers, 1984, pp. 357–388.
- Tillemans, T.J.F. (1986a). «Dharmakīti, Āryadeva and Dharmapāla on Scriptural Authority», Tetsugaku, Felicitation Volume for Profs. A. Uno and K. Ogura, Hiroshima 1986, pp. 31–47.
- Tillemans, T.J.F. (1986b). «Identity and Referential Opacity in Tibetan Buddhist apoha Theory», in B. K. Matilal et R.D. Evans (eds.), Buddhist Logic and Epistemology, Studies in the Buddhist Analysis of Inference and Language. Dordrecht : D. Reidel, 1986, pp. 207–227.
- Tillemans, T.J.F. (1986c). «Pramāṇavārttika IV (1)», Wiener Zeitschrift für die Kunde Südasiens XXX, 1986, Institut für Kultur- und Geistesgeschichte Asiens der Österreichischen Akademie der Wissenschaften, Institut für Indologie der Universität Wien, pp. 143–162.
- Tillemans, T.J.F. (1986d) (with Masahiro Inami). «Another Look at the Framework of the Pramāṇasiddhi Chapter of Pramāṇavārttika», Wiener Zeitschrift für die Kunde Südasiens XXX, 1986, pp. 123–142.
- Tillemans, T.J.F. (1987). «Pramāṇavārttika IV (2)», Wiener Zeitschrift für die Kunde Südasiens XXXI, 1987, pp. 141–161.

09.04.2007 2

- Tillemans, T.J.F. (1988a). «On bdag and gzhan and Related Notions of Tibetan Grammar», in H. Uebach et J. Panglung (eds.). Tibetan Studies. Munich: Kommission für Zentralasiatische Studien, Bayerische Akademie der Wissenschaften, 1988, pp. 491–502.

12) 1988b. «Some Reflections on R.S.Y. Chi's Buddhist Formal Logic», Journal of the International Association of Buddhist Studies Vol. 11, no. 1, Indiana University, Bloomington, Indiana, 1988, pp. 155–171.

- Tillemans, T.J.F. (1989a) «Indian and Tibetan Mādhyamikas on mānasapratyakṣa», The Tibet Journal Vol. XIV, no. 1, Dharam-sala, India, 1989, pp. 70–85.

14) 1989b. «Formal and Semantic Aspects of Tibetan Buddhist Debate Logic», Journal of Indian Philosophy 17, 1989, pp. 265–297.

- Tillemans, T.J.F. (1990). «On sapakṣa», Journal of Indian Philosophy, 18, 1990, pp 53–79.

16) 1991a. «Dharmakīrti on Some Sophisms», in E. Steinkellner (ed.), Studies in the Buddhist Epistemological Tradition. Proceedings of the Second International Dharmakīrti Conference Vienna, June 11–16, 1989. Österreichische Akademie der Wissenschaften, Philosophisch-Historische Klasse, Beiträge zur Kultur- und Geistesgeschichte Asiens 8. Vienna : Verlag der Österreichische Akademie der Wissenschaften. pp. 403–418.

- Tillemans, T.J.F. (1991b). «gSer tog Blo bzang tshul khrims rgya mtsho on Tibetan Verbs», in E. Steinkellner (ed.), Tibetan History and Language. Studies dedicated to Uray Géza on his seventieth birthday. Wiener Studien zur Tibetologie und Buddhismuskunde 26, Vienna: Arbeitskreis für Tibetische und Buddhistische Studien. pp. 487–496.
- Tillemans, T.J.F. (1991c). «More on parārthānumāna, Theses and Syllogisms», Études Asiatiques XLV, 1, 1991, pp. 133–148.
- Tillemans, T.J.F. (1991d). «A Note on bdag don phal ba in Tibetan Grammar», Études Asiatiques XLV, 2, 1991, pp. 311–323.
- Tillemans, T.J.F. (1992a). «Pramāṇavārttika IV (3)», in J. Bronkhorst, K. Mimaki and T. Tillemans (ed.) Études bouddhiques offertes à Jacques May. Études Asiatiques XLVI, 1, 1992, pp. 437–467.
- Tillemans, T.J.F. (1992b). «La logique bouddhique est-elle une logique non-classique où déviante? Remarques sur le tétralemme (catuṣkoṭi)», Les Cahiers de Philosophie [L'Orient de la pensée. Philosophies en Inde] 14, 1992, pp. 183–198, Lille, France.
- Tillemans, T.J.F. (1992c). «Tsong kha pa et al. on the Bhāvaviveka-Candrakīrti Debate», in Tibetan Studies, Proceedings of the 5th Seminar of the International Association for Tibetan Studies, NARITA 1989. [Monograph Series, Occasional Papers 2]. Naritasan shinshoji, Narita, 1992, pp. 315–326.
- Tillemans, T.J.F. (1992d) «Amour et religion. Vingt-cinq poèmes tirés d'une nouvelle collection attribuée au sixième Dalai Lama», Études de Lettres [Étude des Religions], Revue de la Faculté des Lettres, Université de Lausanne, Octobre-Décembre 1992, pp. 125–142.
- Tillemans, T.J.F. (1993). «Pramāṇavārttika IV (4)», Wiener Zeitschrift für die Kunde Südasiens XXXVII, 1993, pp. 135–164.
- Tillemans, T.J.F. (1994a). «On Agents and Actions in Classical Tibetan. A Reply to Roy A. Miller», Indo-Iranian Journal, 37, Dordrecht, Kluwer Academic Publishers, 1994, pp. 121–138.
- Tillemans, T.J.F. (1994b). «Pre-Dharmakīrti Commentators on Dignāga's Definition of a Thesis (pakṣalakṣaṇa)», In T. Skorupszki and U. Pagel (eds.), The Buddhist Forum Vol. III, Papers in honour and appreciation of Prof. David Seyfort Ruegg's contribution to Indological, Buddhist and Tibetan Studies. School of Oriental and African Studies, University of London, 1994, p. 295-305.
- Tillemans, T.J.F. (1995a). «Pramāṇavārttika IV (5)», Wiener Zeitschrift für die Kunde Südasiens XXXIX, 1995, p. 103-150.
- Tillemans, T.J.F. (1995b). «Dharmakīrti and Tibetans on adṛśyānupalabdhihetu», Journal of Indian Philosophy, 23, 1995, p. 129-149.
- Tillemans, T.J.F. (1995c). «On the So-called Difficult Point of the apoha Theory», Etudes Asiatiques / Asiatische Studien XLIX, 4, 1995, p. 853-890.
- Tillemans, T.J.F. (1995d) (with T. Tomabechi). «Le dBu ma'i byuṅ tshul de Śākya mchog ldan», Etudes Asiatiques / Asiatische Studien XLIX, 4, 1995, p. 891-918.
- Tillemans, T.J.F. (1995e.) «Remarks on Philology, » Journal of the International Association of Buddhist Studies, 1995.2, p. 269-277.
- Tillemans, T.J.F. (1996). «What Would it be Like to be Selfless? Hīnayānist Versions, Mahāyānist Versions and Derek Parfit, » Etudes Asiatiques / Asiatische Studien L, 4, 1996, p. 835-852.
- Tillemans, T.J.F. (1997). «On a Recent Translation of the Saņdhinirmocanasūtra, » Journal of the International Association of Buddhist Studies, 1997, 1, p. 153-164.

09.04.2007 3

- Tillemans, T.J.F. (1997a). «Dharmakīrti on prasiddha and yogyatā,» in Aspects of Buddhism, ed. A. Bareja-Starzynska et M. Mejor, Studia Indologiczne, Oriental Institute, Warsaw University, 1997, p. 177-194.
- Tillemans, T.J.F. (1997b). «Où va la philologie bouddhique? » [Inaugural lecture given at Lausanne, Octobre 27, 1993], In Études de Lettres. Revue de la Faculté des Lettres, Université de Lausanne, 1997, 4, p. 3-17.
- Tillemans, T.J.F. (1998a) (with Donald S. Lopez, Jr.) «What can one Reasonably Say about Nonexistence? A Tibetan Work on the Problem of āśrayāsiddha, » Journal of Indian Philosophy, 26, 1998, p. 99-129.
- Tillemans, T.J.F. (1998b). «A Note on Pramāṇavārttika, Pramāṇasamuccaya and Nyāyamukha. What is the svadharmin in Buddhist logic?, » Journal of the International Association of Buddhist Studies 21, 1, 1998, p. 111-124.
- Tillemans, T.J.F. (1998c). «Issues in Tibetan Philosophy, » in E. Craig (ed.) Routledge Encyclopedia of Philosophy. Routledge Co, London, 1998, Volume 9, p. 402-409.
- Tillemans, T.J.F. (1998d). «Tsong kha pa blo bzang grags pa, » in E. Craig (ed.) Routledge Encyclopedia of Philosophy. Routledge Co, London, 1998, Volume 9, p. 487-490.
- Tillemans, T.J.F. (1999). «How Much of a Proof is Scripturally Based Inference (āgamāśritānumāna), » in Shoryu Katsura (ed.) Dharmakīrti's Thought and its Impact on Indian and Tibetan Philosophy. Oesterreichische Akademie der Wissenschaften. Philosophisch-Historische Klasse Denkschriften, 281. Band. Verlag der Oesterreichischen Akademie der Wissenschaften. Vienna, 1999, p. 395-404.
- Tillemans, T.J.F. (2001). «Trying to be Fair to Mādhyamika Buddhism, » The Numata Yehan Lecture in Buddhism, Winter 2001. Numata lecture series of the Dept. of Religious Studies, University of Calgary, Alberta, Canada, 2001, p. 1-29.
- Tillemans, T.J.F. (2003a). «Metaphysics for Mādhyamikas, » in Georges Dreyfus and Sara McClintock (eds), The Svātantrika-Prāsaṅgika Distinction. What difference does a difference make? Studies in Indian and Tibetan Buddhism. Wisdom Publications: Boston, MA, 2003, p. 93-123.
- Tillemans, T.J.F. (2003b). «On the Assimilation of Indic Grammatical Literature into Indigenous Tibetan Scholarship, » Études Asiatiques / Asiatische Studien LVII, 1, 2003, p. 213-235.
- Tillemans, T.J.F. (2004a). «Inductiveness, Deductiveness and Examples in Buddhist Logic, » in Shoryu Katsura and Ernst Steinkellner (eds). The Role of the Example (dṛṣṭānta) in Classical Indian Logic. Wiener Studien zur Tibetologie und Buddhismuskunde, Heft 59, Vienna 2004, p. 251-275.
- Tillemans, T.J.F. (2004b). «What are Mādhyamikas Refuting? Śāntarakṣta, Kamalaśīla et alii on Superimpositions (samāropa), » in T. Wada (ed.) Three Mountains and Five Rivers. Prof. Musashi Tachikawa's Felicitation Volume, Delhi: Motilal Banarsidass, 2004, p. 225-237.
- Tillemans, T.J.F. (2005). « The Slow Death of the trairūpya in Buddhist Logic: A propos of Sa skya Paṇḍita, » Hōrin. Vergleichende Studien zur japanischen Kultur, 11, Düsseldorf, 2005, p. 83-93.
- Tillemans, T.J.F. (2007). «Trying to be Fair to Mādhyamika Buddhism, » in Karin Preisendanz (ed.), Expanding and Merging Horizons. Contributions to South Asian and Cross-Cultural Studies in Commemoration of Wilhelm Halbfass. Vienna: Österreichische Akademie der Wissenschaften, Philosophisch-Historiche Klasse Denkschriften, 351, Band, 2007, p. 507-524.
- Tillemans, T.J.F. (2007). "Transitivity, Intransitivity, and tha dad pa Verbs in Traditional Tibetan Grammar" Pacific World (Third Series) 9: 49-62.
