= Vyapti =

Concept of Invariable concomitance in Indian Logic

Vyapti, a Sanskrit expression, in Hindu philosophy refers to the state of pervasion. It is considered as the logical ground of inference which is one of the means to knowledge. No conclusion can be inferred without the knowledge of vyapti. Vyapti guarantees the truth of conclusion. It signifies the relation of invariable concomitance between "hetu" and "sadhya" and is of two kinds. Vyapti between terms of unequal extension is called "asamavyavyapti" or "visamavyapti", and vyapti between equal extensions is called "samavyapti".

Vyapti is a universal statement that expresses the "niyata sahacharya" or relation of constant concomitance between hetu or the middle term and sadhya or the major term and implies the "sahacara" i.e. the knowledge of invariable relation of causality or co-existence between sadhya and hetu in all the three instances of time, which is possible when the "anupadhika sambandha" i.e. relation of unconditionality between the two is known. It is defined as the unconditional and constant concomitant relation between "vyapya", the pervaded, and "vyapaka", the pervader.

The Charvaka school of Indian philosophy while admitting the existence of the world and denying pre-existence rejects inference and testimony; they recognize perception as the only means to knowledge. They hold the view that the universal concomitance of the middle term with the major term can never be known since their agreement in presence and agreement in absence can never be known as also their invariable concomitance because there are no class-characters and universals. Vyapti can never be known because it does not exist. If inductive inference is proved by vyapti then these two cannot be mutually dependent.

The Nyaya school of Gautama speaks of five-membered inference or "pararthanumana". Knowledge of vyapti is considered by this school to be the cause of successful inference because inference depends upon the unconditional universal concomitance between the middle term and the major term, the middle term indicating the existence of the major term, and is to be found in the minor term or "paksa", the subject of inference. It is not possible to perceive all instances of the middle term and the major term nor can vyapti be known by internal perception. In order for the inference to be sound the major and the minor premises have to be true, the former should be secure because the latter’s truth is given by perception. They hold the view that vyapti is the unconditional uniform relation of the reason to the predicate and that a condition pervades the predicate. Faulty reasons such as inconclusive ("savyabhicara"), contradictory ("viruddha"), counterbalanced ("prakaranasama"), unproved ("sadhyasama"), and mistimed ("atitkala") or contradicted ("badhita') hinder the production of a valid inference when they are known. Vyapti is known by the joint method of agreement in presence and agreement in absence based on repeated observation aided by favourable hypothetical reasoning. Doubt about vyapti and certainty of the absence of vyapti act as hindrances to inferential knowledge; the certainty about vyapti is the cause of inferential knowledge.

Jain philosophy recognizes inference ("anumana") as a valid means of knowledge. They consider induction ("tarka") to be the knowledge of the invariable concomitance (vyapti) of the middle term with the major term in the three periods of time, arising from the observation of their co-presence and co-absence, and vyapti to be of two kinds, "anvayavyapti" and "vyatirekavyapti". Wherever there is smoke, there is fire; this is anvayavyapti. Wherever there is no fire, there is no smoke; this is vyatirekavyapti. They hold the view that inference is based on vyapti which is derived from induction.

The followers of the Advaita Vedanta do not regard the knowledge of the existence of the probans, pervaded by the probandum, in the subject of inference as the cause of inference or the instrumental cause of inference. Vyapti is the co-existence of the probans and the probandum in all the strata of the probans and does not depend upon the agreement in absence between the probans and the probandum. Inference is "anvayi" and depends upon the agreement in presence between the probans and the probandum and is founded on their positive concomitance. They reject anvaya-vyatireki inference recognized by the Navya Nayaya.

Even though most schools of Indian thought have proposed their own method of ascertaining vyapti, because they base the knowledge of universal propositions on the principle of causality and essential identity in order to know how cause and effect are universally related, the Buddhists adopt the method of "pancakarani". To the Vedantins vyapti is the result of an induction by simple enumeration. The Naiyayikas firstly look for the relation of agreement in presence between two things, and thereafter look for the uniform agreement in absence between them, then they look for contrary instances and finally eliminate all upadhi or conditions. They supplement the uncontradicted experience of the relation between two facts by tarka or indirect proof and by "samanylakshana"

With regard to the "Ashta Siddhis" that already exist in nature, the followers of Aurobindo agree that consciousness in itself is free to communicate between one mind and another without physical means consciously and voluntarily, and it does so through two siddhis, namely, "Vyapti" and "Prakamya". Vyapti is when feelings of others from outside are felt, and also when one sends own thoughts to others. Prakamya is when one looks mentally or physically at something and perceives what is in that thing or super-perceives via the senses
