= Pramana =

Epistemology, proof, reliable means of knowledge in Indian philosophies

Pramana (Sanskrit: प्रमाणम्; IAST: Pramāṇam) literally means "proof" and "means of knowledge". One of the core concepts in Indian epistemology, pramanas are one or more reliable and valid means by which human beings gain accurate, true knowledge. The focus of pramana is how correct knowledge can be acquired, how one knows, how one does not know, and to what extent knowledge pertinent about someone or something can be acquired.

While the number of pramanas varies widely from system to system, many ancient and medieval Indian texts identify six (Note: A few Indian scholars such as Vedvyasa discuss ten, Krtakoti discusses eight, but six is most widely accepted. Some systems admit as few as three pramanas. See Andrew J. Nicholson (2013), Unifying Hinduism: Philosophy and Identity in Indian Intellectual History, Columbia University Press, ISBN 978-0231149877, pages 149-150; see also the Encyclopedia Britannica entry on this topic.) pramanas as correct means of accurate knowledge and attaining to the truth. Three of these are almost universally accepted: perception (pratyakṣa), inference (anumāna), and "word" (śabda), meaning the testimony of past or present reliable experts. The other three pramanas are more contentious: comparison and analogy (upamāna); postulation or derivation from circumstances (arthāpatti); and non-perception, or proof from absence (anupalabdhi). Each of these are further categorized in terms of conditionality, completeness, confidence, and possibility of error.

The various schools of Indian philosophies vary on how many of these six pramanas are epistemically reliable and valid means to knowledge. For example, the Charvaka school of the Śramaṇa tradition holds that only one (perception) is a reliable source of knowledge, Buddhism holds that two (perception, inference) are valid means, Jainism holds three (perception, inference and testimony) as valid, and the Mimamsa and Advaita Vedanta schools of Hinduism hold that all six pramanas are useful and can be reliable means to knowledge. The various schools of Indian philosophy have debated whether one of the six forms of pramana can be derived from another and the relative uniqueness of each. For example, Buddhism considers Buddha and other "valid persons", "valid scriptures" and "valid minds" as indisputable, but that such testimony is a form of perception and inference pramanas.

== Etymology ==
Pramāṇa literally means "proof," based on the word pramā. The Sanskrit root pra (Sanskrit: प्र), is a preposition meaning "outward" or "forth", and mā (Sanskrit: मा) means "measurement." Pramā means "correct notion, true knowledge, basis, foundation, understand." Pramāṇa being a nominalization of the word, means that which is a "means of acquiring pramā or certain, correct, true knowledge". Pramāṇa is not used to describe processes that produce false cognition. For example, if sense perception produces false cognition, then it is called pramāṇa-ābhāsa

Pramāṇa forms one part of a trio of concepts, which describe the ancient Indian view on how knowledge is gained. The other two concepts are pramātŗ, (Sanskrit: प्रमातृ, the subject, the knower) and prameya (Sanskrit: प्रमेयम्, the object, the knowable). They each influence the knowledge, by their own characteristic and the process of knowing.

In Buddhist literature, pramāṇa is referred to as pramāṇavāda. Pramāṇa is also related to the Indian concept of yukti (Sanskrit: युक्तिः) which means active application of epistemology or what one already knows, innovation, clever expedients or connections, methodological or reasoning trick, joining together, application of contrivance, means, method, novelty or device to more efficiently achieve a purpose. yukti and pramāṇa are discussed together in some Indian texts, with yukti described as active process of gaining knowledge in contrast to passive process of gaining knowledge through observation/perception. The texts on pramana, particularly by Samkhya, Yoga, Mimamsa and Advaita Vedanta schools of Hinduism, often include in their scope what might be termed "theories of errors"; that is, philosophies regarding the reason for human error, how one may know if one is wrong, and—if so—how one can discover whether one's epistemic method or conclusion was flawed, as well what one ought then do in order to correct it.

== Hinduism ==
=== Number of pramanas ===
While epistemologists recognize as many as ten pramāṇas, three are given most attention: sense perception (pratyakṣa), inference or reason (anumāna), and testimony (śabda).

Hinduism identifies six pramanas as correct means of accurate knowledge and to truths: Pratyakṣa (evidence/perception), Anumāna (inference), Upamāna (comparison and analogy), Arthāpatti (postulation, derivation from circumstances), Anupalabdhi (non-perception, negative/cognitive proof) and Śabda (word, testimony of past or present reliable experts).

In verse 1.2.1 of the Taittirīya Āraṇyaka (c. 9th–6th centuries BCE), "four means of attaining correct knowledge" are listed: smṛti ("scripture, tradition"), pratyakṣa ("perception"), aitihya ("expert testimony, historical tradition"), and anumāna ("inference").

In some texts such as by Vedvyasa, ten pramanas are discussed, Krtakoti discusses eight epistemically reliable means to correct knowledge. Six most widely recognized pramanas are:

==== Pratyaksham ====
Pratyaksham (Sanskrit: प्रत्यक्षम्, romanized: Pratyakṣam) means perception. It is of two types: external and internal. External perception arises from the interaction between the five senses and worldly objects, while internal perception refers to the awareness arising from the inner sense, the mind. According to Matt Stefan, the distinction is between direct perception (anubhava/anubhavaḥ) and remembered perception (smriti/smṛti).

The ancient and medieval Indian texts identify four requirements for correct perception:

1. Indriyārthasannikarṣaḥ (Sanskrit: इन्द्रियार्थसन्निकर्षः): direct experience by one's sensory organ(s) with object being studied.
2. Avyapadeśya: non-verbal; correct perception is not through hearsay, where one's sensory organ relies on accepting or rejecting someone else's perception, with no intermediate agency involved.
3. Avyabhicāra: consistency; correct perception does not change, nor is it the result of deception because one's sensory organ or means of observation is drifting, defective, or suspect.
4. Vyavasāyātmika: definite; lacks bias, and inferential judgment; correct perception excludes doubt, either from failure to observe all the details, or from mixing inference with observation.

Some ancient scholars proposed "unusual perception" as a pramāṇa, describing it as internal perception, a view contested by other Indian scholars. These internal perceptions include pratibhā (intuition), sāmānyalakṣaṇapratyakṣa (induction from specifics to a universal), and jñānalakṣaṇapratyakṣa (perceiving prior states of a 'topic of study' by observing its present state). Some schools of Hinduism considered and refined rules of accepting uncertain knowledge from pratyakṣa pramana, distinguishing nirṇaya (definite judgment, conclusion) from anadhyavasāya (indefinite judgment).

Many Hindu schools also accept non-sensory experience as a form of knowledge. Knowledge without the five senses— perception without one of the five senses coming into contact with a physical object— is considered possible because the self is taken to be distinct from the mind and body. Thus reality can be revealed through internal insight.

==== Anumanam ====
Anumanam (Sanskrit: अनुमानम्, romanized: Anumānam) means 'inference' in Sanskrit, though it often is used to mean 'guess' in modern Indian languages. In the context of classical philosophy, it is described as reaching a new conclusion and truth from one or more observations and previous truths by applying reason. Observing smoke and inferring fire is an example of Anumana. In all except one Hindu philosophies, this is a valid and useful means to knowledge. The method of inference is explained by Indian texts as consisting of three parts: pratijna (hypothesis), hetu (a reason), and drshtanta (examples). The hypothesis must further be broken down into two parts, state the ancient Indian scholars: sadhya (that idea which needs to be proven or disproven) and paksha (the object on which the sadhya is predicated). The inference is conditionally true if sapaksha (positive examples as evidence) are present, and if vipaksha (negative examples as counter-evidence) are absent. For rigor, the Indian philosophies also state further epistemic steps. For example, they demand Vyapti—the requirement that the hetu (reason) must necessarily and separately account for the inference in "all" cases, in both sapaksha and vipaksha. A conditionally proven hypothesis is called a nigamana (conclusion).

==== Upamanam ====
Upamanam (Sanskrit: उपमानम्, romanized: Upamānam) means comparison and analogy. Some Hindu schools consider it as a proper means of knowledge. Upamana, states Lochtefeld, may be explained with the example of a traveller who has never visited lands or islands with endemic population of wildlife. He or she is told, by someone who has been there, that in those lands you see an animal that sort of looks like a cow, grazes like a cow but is different from a cow in such and such way. Such use of analogy and comparison is, state the Indian epistemologists, a valid means of conditional knowledge, as it helps the traveller identify the new animal later. The subject of comparison is formally called upameyam, the object of comparison is called upamanam, while the attribute(s) are identified as samanya. Thus, explains Monier Williams, if a boy says "her face is like the moon in charmingness", "her face" is upameyam, the moon is upamanam, and charmingness is samanya. The 7th-century text Bhaṭṭikāvya in verses 10.28 through 10.63 discusses many types of comparisons and analogies, identifying when this epistemic method is more useful and reliable, and when it is not. In various ancient and medieval texts of Hinduism, 32 types of Upamāna and their value in epistemology are debated.

==== Arthapatti ====
Arthapatti (Sanskrit: अर्थापत्तिः, romanized: Arthāpattiḥ) means postulation, derivation from circumstances. In contemporary logic, this pramana is similar to circumstantial implication. As an example, if a person was left in a boat on a river earlier, and the time is now past the expected time of arrival, then the circumstances support the truth postulate that the person has arrived. Many Indian scholars considered this pramana as invalid or at best weak, because the boat may have gotten delayed or diverted. However, in cases such as deriving the time of a future sunrise or sunset, this method was asserted by the proponents to be reliable. Another common example for arthapatti in ancient Hindu texts is, that if "Devadatta is fat" and "Devadatta does not eat during the day", then the following must be true: "Devadatta eats in the night". This form of postulation and deriving from circumstances is, claim the Indian scholars, a means to discovery, proper insight and knowledge. The Hindu schools that accept this means of knowledge state that this method is a valid means to conditional knowledge and truths about a subject and object in original premises or different premises. The schools that do not accept this method, state that postulation, extrapolation and circumstantial implication is either derivable from other pramanas or flawed means to correct knowledge, instead one must rely on direct perception or proper inference.

==== Anupalabdhi ====
Anupalabdhi (Sanskrit: अनुपलब्धिः, romanized: Anupalabdhiḥ) means non-perception, negative/cognitive proof. Anupalabdhi pramana suggests that knowing a negative, such as "there is no jug in this room" is a form of valid knowledge. If something can be observed or inferred or proven as non-existent or impossible, then one knows more than what one did without such means. In the two schools of Hinduism that consider Anupalabdhi as epistemically valuable, a valid conclusion is either sadrupa (positive) or asadrupa (negative) relation—both correct and valuable. Like other pramana, Indian scholars refined Anupalabdi to four types: non-perception of the cause, non-perception of the effect, non-perception of object, and non-perception of contradiction. Only two schools of Hinduism accepted and developed the concept "non-perception" as a pramana. The schools that endorsed Anupalabdi affirmed that it is valid and useful when the other five pramanas fail in one's pursuit of knowledge and truth.

Abhava (अभाव) means non-existence. Some scholars consider Anupalabdi to be the same as Abhava, while others consider Anupalabdi and Abhava as different. Abhava-pramana has been discussed in ancient Hindu texts in the context of Padārtha (पदार्थ, referent of a term). A Padartha is defined as that which is simultaneously Astitva (existent), Jneyatva (knowable) and Abhidheyatva (nameable). Specific examples of padartha, states Bartley, include dravya (substance), guna (quality), karma (activity/motion), samanya/jati (universal/class property), samavaya (inherence) and vishesha (individuality). Abhava is then explained as "referents of negative expression" in contrast to "referents of positive expression" in Padartha. An absence, state the ancient scholars, is also "existent, knowable and nameable", giving the example of negative numbers, silence as a form of testimony, asatkaryavada theory of causation, and analysis of deficit as real and valuable. Abhava was further refined in four types, by the schools of Hinduism that accepted it as a useful method of epistemology: dhvamsa (termination of what existed), atyanta-abhava (impossibility, absolute non-existence, contradiction), anyonya-abhava (mutual negation, reciprocal absence) and pragavasa (prior, antecedent non-existence).

==== Shabda ====
Shabda (Sanskrit: शब्दः, romanized: Śabdaḥ) means relying on the testimony of past or present reliable experts, for example, the shruti, Vedas. Hiriyanna explains Sabda-pramana as a concept which means reliable expert testimony. The schools of Hinduism which consider it epistemically valid suggest that a human being needs to know numerous facts, and with the limited time and energy available, he can learn only a fraction of those facts and truths directly. He must rely on others, his parent, family, friends, teachers, ancestors and kindred members of society to rapidly acquire and share knowledge and thereby enrich each other's lives. This means of gaining proper knowledge is either spoken or written, but through Sabda (words). The reliability of the source is important, and legitimate knowledge can only come from the Sabda of reliable sources. The disagreement between the schools of Hinduism has been on how to establish reliability. Some schools, such as Charvaka, state that this is never possible, and therefore Sabda is not a proper pramana. Other schools debate means to establish reliability.

=== Acceptance per school ===
Different schools of Hindu philosophy accept one or more of these pramanas as valid epistemology.

==== Charvaka school ====
Charvaka school accepted only one valid source of knowledge—perception. It held all remaining methods as outright invalid or prone to error and therefore invalid.

==== Vaisheshika school ====
Epistemologically, the Vaiśeṣika school considered the following as the only proper means of knowledge:

1. Perception (Pratyakṣa)
2. Inference (Anumāna)

==== Sankhya, Yoga, Vishishtadvaita Vedanta, and Dvaita Vedanta schools ====
According to the Sankhya, Yoga, and two sub-schools of Vedanta, the proper means of knowledge must rely on these three pramanas:

1. Pratyakṣa — perception
2. Anumāna — inference
3. Śabda/Agama — testimony/word of reliable experts

These are enumerated in sutra I.7 of the Yoga Sutras. The mode of Pramana itself in sutra I.6 is distinguished among 5 classes of vritti/mental modification, the others including indiscrimination, verbal delusion, sleep, and memory.

==== Nyaya school ====
Nyaya literally means the science and study of pramanas. The Nyāya school accepts four means of obtaining knowledge (pramāṇa), viz., Perception (Pratyakṣa), Inference (Anumāna), Comparison (Upamāna), and Word (Śabda).

==== Prabhakara Mimamsa school ====
In the Mimamsa school of Hinduism, linked to Prabhakara, the following pramanas are considered as proper:

1. Pratyakṣa (perception)
2. Anumāṇa (inference)
3. Śabda (word, testimony)
4. Upamāṇa (comparison, analogy)
5. Arthapatti (postulation, presumption)

==== Advaita Vedanta and Bhatta Mimamsa schools ====
In Advaita Vedānta, and Mimamsa school linked to Kumārila Bhaṭṭa, the following pramanas are accepted:

1. Śabda (word, testimony)
2. Pratyakṣa (perception)
3. Anumāṇa (inference)
4. Upamāṇa (comparison, analogy)
5. Arthāpatti (postulation, presumption)
6. Anupalabdhi, Abhava (non-perception, cognitive proof using non-existence)

Nearly all Vedantins, except Neo-Vedantins for example, accept śabda pramāṇa as a more important pramāṇa than anumāna.

== Buddhism ==
According to the Padmākara Translation Group, in a 2005 translation of Śāntarakṣita's The Adornment of the Middle Way:

Strictly speaking, pramana (tshad ma) means "valid cognition." In [Buddhist] practice, it refers to the tradition, principally associated with Dignāga and Dharmakīrti, of logic (rtags rigs) and epistemology (blo rigs).

Buddhism accepts only two pramana (tshad ma) as valid means to knowledge: Pratyaksha (mngon sum tshad ma, perception) and Anumāṇa (rjes dpag tshad ma, inference). Rinbochay adds that Buddhism also considers scriptures as the third valid pramana, such as from Buddha and other "valid minds" and "valid persons". This third source of valid knowledge is a form of perception and inference in Buddhist thought. Valid scriptures, valid minds and valid persons are considered in Buddhism as Avisamvadin (mi slu ba, incontrovertible, indisputable). Means of cognition and knowledge, other than perception and inference, are considered invalid in Buddhism.

In Buddhism, the two most important scholars of pramāṇa are Dignāga and Dharmakīrti.

=== Sautrantrika ===
Dignāga and Dharmakīrti are usually categorized as expounding the view of the Sautrāntika tenets, though one can make a distinction between the "Sautrāntikas Following Scripture" (Tibetan: ལུང་གི་རྗེས་འབྲང་གི་མདོ་སྡེ་པ, Wylie: lung gi rjes 'brang gi mdo sde pa) and the "Sautrāntikas Following Reason" (Tibetan: རིགས་པ་རྗེས་འབྲང་གི་མདོ་སྡེ་པ, Wylie: rigs pa rjes 'brang gi mdo sde pa) and both these masters are described as establishing the latter. Dignāga's main text on this topic is the Pramāṇa-samuccaya. Dignāga's Pramāṇa-samuccaya played a crucial role in shaping the discipline of epistemology (pramāṇaśāstra), blending it with logical discourse. Dharmakīrti, influenced by Dignāga, further developed these ideas in his Pramanavarttika.

These two rejected the complex Abhidharma-based description of how in the Vaibhāṣika school and the Sautrāntika Following Scripture approach connected an external world with mental objects, and instead posited that the mental domain never connects directly with the external world but instead only perceives an aspect based upon the sense organs and the sense consciousnesses. Further, the sense consciousnesses assume the form of the aspect (Sanskrit: Sākāravāda) of the external object and what is perceived is actually the sense consciousness which has taken on the form of the external object. By starting with aspects, a logical argument about the external world as discussed by the Hindu schools was possible. Otherwise their views would be so different as to be impossible to begin a debate. Then a logical discussion could follow.

This approach attempts to solve how the material world connects with the mental world, but not completely explaining it. When pushed on this point, Dharmakīrti then drops a presupposition of the Sautrāntrika position and shifts to a kind of Yogācāra position that extramental objects never really occur but arise from the habitual tendencies of mind. So he begins a debate with Hindu schools positing external objects then later to migrate the discussion to how that is logically untenable.

Note there are two differing interpretations of Dharmakīrti's approach later in Tibet, due to differing translations and interpretations. One is held by the Gelug school leaning to a moderate realism with some accommodation of universals and the other held by the other schools who held that Dharmakīrti was distinctly antirealist.

==== Apoha ====
A key feature of Dignāga's logic is in how he treats generalities versus specific objects of knowledge. The Nyāya Hindu school made assertions about the existence of general principles, and in refutation Dignāga asserted that generalities were mere mental features and not truly existent. To do this he introduced the idea of Apoha, that the way the mind recognizes is by comparing and negating known objects from the perception. In that way, the general idea or categories of objects has to do with differences from known objects, not from identification with universal truths. So one knows that a perceived chariot is a chariot not because it is in accord with a universal form of a chariot, but because it is perceived as different from things that are not chariots. This approach became an essential feature of Buddhist epistemology.

=== Madhyamaka ===
The contemporary of Dignāga but before Dharmakīrti, Bhāvaviveka, incorporated a logical approach when commenting upon Nāgārjuna. He also started with a Sautrāntika approach when discussing the way appearances appear, to debate with realists, but then took a Middle Way view of the ultimate nature of phenomenon. But he used logical assertions and arguments about the nature of that ultimate nature.

His incorporation of logic into the Middle Way system was later critiqued by Candrakīrti, who felt that the establishment of the ultimate way of abiding since it was beyond thought and concept was not the domain of logic. He used simple logical consequence arguments to refute the views of other tenet systems, but generally he thought a more developed use of logic and epistemology in describing the Middle Way was problematic. Bhāvaviveka's use of autonomous logical arguments was later described as the Svātantrika approach.

=== In Tibet ===
Modern Buddhist schools employ the 'three spheres' (Sanskrit: trimaṇḍala; Tibetan: 'khor gsum):

1. subject
2. object,
3. action.

When Madhyamaka first migrated to Tibet, Śāntarakṣita established a view of Madhyamaka more consistent with Bhāvaviveka while further evolving logical assertions as a way of contemplating and developing one's viewpoint of the ultimate truth.

In the 14th century Je Tsongkhapa presented a new commentary and approach to Madhyamaka, which became the normative form in Tibet. In this variant, the Madhyamaka approach of Candrakīrti was elevated instead of Bhāvaviveka's yet Tsongkhapa rejected Candrakirti's disdain of logic and instead incorporated logic further.

The exact role of logic in Tibetan Buddhist practice and study may still be a topic of debate, but it is definitely established in the tradition. Ju Mipham remarked in his 19th-century commentary on Śāntarakṣita's Madhyamakālaṅkāra:

The Buddha's doctrine, from the exposition of the two truths onward, unerroneously sets forth the mode of being of things as they are. And the followers of the Buddha must establish this accordingly, through the use of reasoning. Such is the unerring tradition of Śakyamuni. On the other hand, to claim that analytical investigation in general and the inner science of pramana, or logic, in particular are unnecessary is a terrible and evil spell, the aim of which is to prevent the perfect assimilation, through valid reasoning, of the Buddha's words

== See also ==
- Buddhist logic
- Epistemology
- Hindu philosophy
- Metaphysics
- Nyaya
- Philosophy of Perception
- Śāstra pramāṇam in Hinduism

== Sources ==
- Puligandla, Ramakrishna (1997), Fundamentals of Indian Philosophy, New Delhi: D.K. Printworld (P) Ltd.

== Bibliography ==
- Śāntarakṣita (author); Mipham (commentator); Padmākara Translation Group (translators)(2005). The Adornment of the Middle Way: Shantarakshita's Madhyamakalankara with commentary by Jamgön Mipham. Boston, Massachusetts, US: Shambhala Publications, Inc. ISBN 1-59030-241-9 (alk. paper)
