= Pramāṇa-samuccaya =

Buddhist philosophical treatise focusing on epistemology (pramana) by Dignāga

The Pramāṇa-samuccaya (Compendium of Epistemology) is a Buddhist philosophical treatise focusing on epistemology (pramana) by Dignāga, an Indian Buddhist logician and epistemologist who lived from c. 480 to c. 540 CE.

The Pramāṇa-samuccaya exists in two Tibetan translations by Vasudhararaksita and Kanakavarman respectively. The original Sanskrit was initially thought to be lost by modern scholars, but then a manuscript of the commentary by Jinendrabuddhi was discovered. Modern scholars working with The China Tibetology Research Center and the Austrian Academy of Sciences are currently working to extract and reconstruct the Sanskrit root text of the Pramāṇasamuccaya from the commentary in which it is embedded.

== Content ==
Chapter 1
The treatise begins with Dignāga's assertion that there are only two means of knowledge: direct perception and inference. Corresponding to these, there are two objects: particulars and universals.
Direct perception is knowledge which excludes conceptual thought (kalpanā). This only reveals the bare features of an object via the senses. This knowledge is inexpressible in words, relating to real objects and ultimate reality. Errors of perception arise through misinterpretations by conceptual thought. Each item of sense perception is unique. Dignāga does not specify what the nature of the object of perception is, but implies that although it is not atomic or otherwise, it is existent.
Chapter 2
The second chapter concerns the "inference for oneself" (svārthānumāṇa). This is knowledge of what can be inferred through a middle term (liṅga), which has the three characteristics for a valid middle term, namely, that it is concomitantly present in the thesis, present in a similar example and absent from a dissimilar example. According to Dignāga, inference only deals with universals and is always dependent upon the subject/object relation.
Chapter 3
The subject of this chapter is the "inference for other" (parārthānumāṇa), the process by which one makes public what one knows, by formal means, using a syllogistic means of argument. This typically takes the following form:

- Thesis: Sound is impermanent
- Reason: Because it is created
- Exemplification: Whatever is created is known to be impermanent
- Similar example: As in the case of a pot
- Dissimilar example: As not in the case of space

Chapter 4
Dignāga offers examples of how inferences are to be used and how to select relevant examples. In his method of syllogistic logic, agreeing and different examples are needed to establish concomitance of the middle term.
Chapter 5
Dignāga defines the "exclusion of other" (anyāpoha). Here, Dignāga first eliminates authority as a separate valid means of knowledge, stating that it is a kind of inference. Authority is acceptable only if it does not contradict one's own perception and inference. Dignāga states that conceptual knowledge derives from words, but asks what do words mean. He proposes that words express their meaning by exclusion of opposite meanings. Words do not denote real universals, as there is no necessary connection between words and universals. Instead, words only express imaginary concepts and vice versa. In Dignāga's view, words do not produce knowledge by referring to particular objects, but only demark X from non-X. That is, the word "white" does not bring about knowledge of all white objects, but only demarks white from non-white. In this way, some form of classification is possible in the mind through this process of distinctions. This is done by the internal application of agreement and difference, so he maintains that speech derives from inference. However, he adds the proviso that this process is aided by direct perception which helps avoid fallacies. Thus, the imagined world of universals can be made to fit the real world by correcting contradictions in the light of direct perception.

== See also ==
- Nyayakusumanjali
- Tattvacintāmaṇi
