= List of Indian philosophers =

Indian philosophers

Indian philosophy are the systems of thought and reflection that were developed by the civilisations of the Indian subcontinent. They include both orthodox (astika) systems, namely, the Nyaya, Vaisheshika, Samkhya, Yoga, Mimamsa (or Purva-Mimamsa), and Vedanta (Advaita, Dwaita, Bhedbheda, Vishistadvaita), and unorthodox (nastika) systems, such as Buddhism, Jainism, Ajivika, Ajnana, and Charvaka. as well as other schools such as Raseswera, Paninya, Pratyabhijna, Pasupata Shaivism, Shaivism etc. Indian thought has been concerned with various philosophical problems, significant among which are the nature of the world (cosmology), the nature of reality (metaphysics), logic, the nature of knowledge (epistemology), ethics, and the philosophy of religion. Some of the most famous and influential philosophers of all time were from the Indian subcontinent such as the Buddha, Nagarjuna, and Adi Shankara. This list is until the 14th century CE.

Name	Life	School	Notes
Dirghatamas	14th century BCE		
Avatsara	14th century BCE		
Asita	14th century BCE		Seer sage in Rigaveda
Brishaspati	14th century BCE		
Lopamudra	12th century BCE		Wife of sage Agastya
Agastya	12th century BCE		Husband of Lopamudra and one of the saptarishis
Atri	12th century BCE		One of the saptarishis
Bharadwaja	12th century BCE		One of the saptarishis
Vasishtha	12th century BCE		One of the saptarishis
Shakalya	12th century BCE		His Padapatha of the Rig Veda was one of the early attempts in the direction of analysis
Sankhyayana			Composer of Sankhyayana Brahmana
Valmiki	11th century BCE		Valmiki was the writer of Ramyana and is revered as the first poet or Adi Kavi in Sanskrit literature.
Vyasa	9th century BCE		Vyasa was the writer of Mahabharat, the 18 Puranas, the Brahma Sutras, and the compiler of the Vedas.
Mahidasa Aitareya	9th century BCE		
Gargi Vachaknavi	8th century BCE		Debates with Yajnavalkya
Maitreyi	8th century BCE	Advaita	Wife of Yajnavalkya
Aruni	8th century BCE		One of the first philosophers in recorded history.
Ghosha	10th century BCE -8th century BCE		
Yajnavalkya	8th-7th century BCE		Credited for coining Advaita
Sandilya	8th century BCE		Known for Sandilya Vidya, a set of teachings of vidyā or philosophy
Pratardana	8th century BCE		
Bodhayana	8th century BCE	Vishishtadvaita	
Pravahana Jaivali	8th century BCE		Known for Panchagni Vidya, a set of teachings of vidyā or philosophy
Śākaṭāyana	8th century BCE	Nairukta (etymologist)	
Raikva	8th century BCE		
Satyakama Jabala	8th century BCE		
Shukracharya	8th century BCE	Political Philosophy	He wrote Sukraneeti
Parshvanatha	8th century BCE	Jainism	23rd Tirthankara and one of the earliest exponent of Karma philosophy in recorded history
Pippalada	8th century BCE		He was the founder of Pippalada School of thought, which taught the Atharvaveda.
Shvetashvatara	8th century BCE		
Sushrutha	8th century BCE		Credited for Sushruta Samhita, Charaka Samhita and the Astanga Hridaya (regarded as one of the Great Trilogy of Ayurvedic Medicine and on various forms of surgery)
Ashtavakra	7th century BCE		
Shvetaketu	7th century BCE		Grandson of sage and philosopher Aruni
Kapila	6th century BCE	Samkhya	Credited as the founder of the Samkhya school, argued for vegetaraninism
Āḷāra Kālāma	6th century BCE	Samkhya	According to the Pāli Canon scriptures, he was the first teacher of Gautama Buddha.
Uddaka Rāmaputta	6th century BCE		One of the teachers of Gautama Buddha
Panini	6th century BCE		Founder of Paniniya School
Pañcaśikha	6th century BCE	Samkhya	
Asuri	6th century BCE	Samkhya	Student of Kapila
Yaska	6th-5th century BCE	Nairukta (etymologist)	
Brishaspati		Charvaka	
Akṣapāda Gautama	6th century BCE	Nyaya	Credited as the founder of the Nyaya school.
Kanada	6th century BCE	Vaisheshika	Credited as the founder of the Vaisheshika school, explained the creation and existence of the universe by proposing an atomistic theory, applying logic and realism, and is one of the earliest known systematic realist ontology in human history.
Purana Kassapa	6th century BCE	Amoralism	
Ajita Kesakambali	6th century BCE	Charvaka	Ajita propounded Ucchedavada (the Doctrine of Annihilation after death) and Tam-Jivam-tam-sariram-vada (the doctrine of identity of the soul and body), which denied the separate existence of an eternal soul.
Payasi	6th century BCE	Charvaka	
Pakudha Kaccayana	6th century BCE	Sassatavāda	Credited as the founder of the Atomism philosophy
Makkhali Gośāla	6th century BCE	Ajivika	
Sañjaya Belaṭṭhiputta	6th century BCE	Ajñana	
Mahavira	6th century BCE	Jainism	Taught the principles of Anekantavada (many-sided reality): syadvada and nayavada.
Gautama Buddha	6th century BCE		Founder of Buddhism.
Śāriputra	6th century BCE	Buddhism	He is considered the first of the Buddha's two chief male disciples
Kaniyan Pungundranar	5th century BCE		Philosopher from the Sangam age
Pingala	5th century BCE		
Dandamis	4th century BCE		
Kalanos	4th century BCE		
Chanakya	4th century BCE	Political philosophy	He is considered the pioneer of the field of political science and economics in India.
Jaimini	4th century BCE	Mimansa	Founder of Mimansa School
Moggaliputta-Tissa	3rd century BCE	Buddhism	
Avvaiyar	3rd century BCE		Sangam era poet
Bogar	3rd century BCE		One of the 18 celebrated siddhars of Tamil Nadu
Korakkar	3rd century BCE		One of the 18 celebrated siddhars of Tamil Nadu
Patanjali	2nd Century BCE	Paniniya	Founder of Yoga School
Nagasena	2nd Century BCE	Buddhism	
Kātyāyana	2nd Century BCE		
Badarayana	2nd century BCE	Vedanta	Badarayana is regarded as having written the basic text of the Vedanta system, the Vedāntasūtra a.k.a. Brahmasūtra
Manu	2nd century BCE		Author of Manumsriti
Thiruvalluvar	1st Century BCE		
Śabara	1st century CE	Mimansa	Composed the Śābara-bhāṣyam, also known as Mīmāsas̄ūtra-bhas̄ỵa, a commentary on the Purva Mimamsa Sutras.
Lakulisha	1st century CE	Pashupata Shaivism	
Aśvaghoṣa	1st century CE	Buddhism	He is believed to have been the first Sanskrit dramatist, and is considered the greatest Indian poet prior to Kālidāsa.
Gunadhara	1st century CE	Jainism	
Sarvajña Rāmeśvara		Raseśvara	
Govinda Bhagavat		Raseśvara	
Vātsyāyana	1st century CE		Famous for "Kama Sutra"
Nagarjuna	2nd century CE	Buddhism	Founder of Madhyamaka
Kapilar	2nd century CE		
Kundakunda	2nd century CE	Jainism	
Umaswati	2nd century CE	Jainism	Author of the Tattvārthādhigama-sūtra.
Samantabhadra	2nd century CE	Jainism	He was a proponent of the Jaina doctrine of Anekantavada.
Ilango Adigal	2nd century CE	Jainism	
Isvarakrsna	3rd century CE	Samkhya	
Aryadeva	3rd century CE	Buddhism	Aryadeva was a student of Nagarjuna and contributed significantly to the Madhyamaka
Asanga	4th century CE	Buddhism	One of the founder of the Yogachara. He is known as one of the seventeen Nalanda masters.
Aviddhakarṇa		Charvaka	
Vasubandhu	4th century CE	Buddhism	One of the founder of the Yogachara .He is known as one of the seventeen Nalanda masters.
Dignāga	4th century CE	Buddhism	One of the Buddhist founders of Indian logic (hetu vidyā).
Pakṣilasvāmin Vātsyāyana	4th century CE	Nyaya	
Haribhadra	4th century CE	Jainism	
Pujyapada	5th century CE	Jainism	
Buddhaghosa	5th century CE	Buddhism	
Vatsyayana	5th century CE	Nyaya	
Kambalasvatara		Charvaka	
Bodhidharma	5th century CE	Buddhism	
Kamandaka	5th century CE	Kautilyan(Chanakya)School of diplomacy	
Bhartṛhari	5th century CE	Paniniya	
Guṇabhadra	5th century CE	Buddhism	
Maticandra	5th century CE	Samkhya	
Siddhasena	5th century CE	Jainism	
Dharmakirti	6th century CE	Buddhism	He was also one of the primary theorists of Buddhist atomism
Prabhākara	6th century CE	Mimansa	Founder of Pravakar School
Prashastapada	6th century CE	Vaisheshika	
Bhāviveka	6th century CE	Buddhism	In Tibetan Buddhism Bhāviveka is regarded as the founder of the Svātantrika tradition of the Mādhyamaka school of Buddhism
Bodhiruci	6th century CE	Buddhism	
Bhavivikta	6th century CE	Nyaya	
Dharmapala	6th century CE	Buddhism	
Manikyanandi	6th century CE	Jainism	
Śīlabhadra	6th century CE	Buddhism	
Udyotakara	6th century CE	Nyaya-Vaisheshika synthesis	
Bhatta Narayana	6th century CE	Buddhism	
Purandara		Charvaka	
Sthiramati	6th century CE	Buddhism	
Paramartha	6th century CE	Buddhism	
Gaudapada	6th century CE	Advaita	
Buddhapālita	6th century CE	Buddhism	
Buddhapālita	6th century CE	Buddhism	
Kumārila Bhaṭṭa	7th century CE	Mimansa	
Jinabhadra	7th century CE	Jainism	
Buddhaguhya	7th century CE	Buddhism	A key figure in Theravāda Buddhism and the author of the Visuddhimagga.
Chandragomin	7th century CE	Buddhism	Chandragomin was a teacher at Nalanda Monastic University
Pushpadanta	7th century CE	Jainism	
Bhartṛprapañca	7th century CE	Bhedabheda	
Govinda Bhagavatpada	7th century CE	Advaita	He was the Guru of the Adi Shankara.
Rājāna	7th century CE	Samkhya	Wrote the longest commentary on Sankhya-Karika called Yukti-dīpikā, “Light on the arguments”
Bhutabali	7th century CE	Jainism	
Jayarāśi Bhaṭṭa	8th century CE	Ajnana	He is known for his radical skepticism
Kumudendu Muni	8th century CE	Jainism	
Adi Shankara	8th century CE	Advaita	He is credited by some with unifying and establishing the main currents of thought in Hinduism.
Totakacharya	8th century CE	Advaita	He was a disciple of Ādi Śaṅkara
Virasena	8th century CE	Jainism	
Śāntarakṣita	8th century CE	Buddhism	
Virūpa	8th century CE	Buddhism	
Acharya Vamana	8th century CE		Vamana's investigation into the nature of a Kāvya is known as theory of Riti
Hastamalakacharya	8th century CE	Advaita	He was a disciple of Adi Shankara, Hastamalaka founded a matha by name Idayil Matham in Thrissur, Kerala
Jñānagarbha	8th century CE	Buddhism	
Padmapadacharya	8th century CE	Advaita	A follower of Adi Shankara
Vimalamitra	8th century CE	Buddhism	
Udbhatabhatta		Charvaka	
Maṇḍana Miśra	8th century CE	Initially Mimansa, then Advaita	
Nammalvar	8th century CE		One of the twelve alvar saints
Ubaya Bharti	8th century CE	Mimansa	Wife of Maṇḍana Miśra, Famous for debate with Adi Sankara
Nimbarkacharya	8th century CE		He founded Nimbarka Sampradaya, one of four main traditions of Hindu sect Vaishnavism
Śāntarakṣita	8th century CE	Buddhism	
Vidyananda	8th century CE	Jainism	
Śālikanātha	8th century CE	Mimansa	
Vajrabodhi	8th century CE	Buddhism	One of the eight patriarchs in Shingon Buddhism.
Aparajita	8th century CE	Jainism	He defended the practice of Digambara monks of being nude
Śubhakarasiṃha	8th century CE	Buddhism	one of the eight patriarchs in Shingon Buddhism.
Akalanka	8th century CE	Jainism	
Baladevācārya	8th century CE		Father of Sridhara
Haribhadra	8th century CE	Buddhism	Disciple of Śāntarakṣita
Bhāskara	8th century CE	Bhedabheda	
Dharmottara	8th century CE	Buddhism	
Ravigupta	8th century CE	Buddhism	
Jayanta Bhatta	9th century CE	Nyaya	
Anandavardhana	9th century CE		Ānandavardhana is credited with creating the dhvani theory.
Adikavi Pampa	9th century CE	Jainism	
Sridhara	9th century CE		
Vācaspati Miśra	9th century CE	Advaita	
Vasugupta	9th century CE	Pratyabhijna	
Bhatta Kallata	9th century CE	Pratyabhijna	Pupil of Vasugupta
Gunabhadra	9th century CE	Jainism	He co-authored Mahapurana along with Jinasena.
Bhasavarajna	10th century CE	Nyaya	
Udayana	10th century CE	Nyaya	
Śaṅkaranandana	10th century CE	Buddhism	
Ratnavajra	10th century CE	Buddhism	
Utpaladeva	10th century CE	Pratyabhijna	
Laksmanagupta	10th century CE	Pratyabhijna	Son and disciple of Utpaladeva, and teacher of Abhinavagupta
Abhinavagupta	10th century CE		
Kshemaraja	10th century CE	Pratyabhijna	Disciple of Abhinavagupta
Nemichandra	10th century CE	Jainism	
Nathamuni	10th century CE	Vishishtadvaita	
Somānanda	10th century CE	Vishishtadvaita	
Indrabhuti	10th century CE	Buddhism	
Yamunacharya	10th century CE	Vishistadvaita	
Amritchandra	10th century CE	Jainism	
Jñanasrimitra	11th century CE	Buddhism	
Mahapurna	11th century CE		
Yadava Prakaasa	11th century CE	Advaita	One of the teachers of Ramanuja
Atīśa	11th century CE	Buddhism	
Ratnakīrti	11th century CE	Buddhism	
Jinamitra	11th century CE	Jainism	
Jnanasribadara	11th century CE	Buddhism	
Bhoja	11th century CE		
Nimbarkacharya	11th century CE	Dvaitadvaita	
Prabhācandra	11th century CE	Jainism	
Basavanna	(c. 1131–1167 CE)	Lingayatism	Socio-religious reforms, Anubhava Mantapa, Vachana literature
Avvaiyar	12th century CE		Famous for collection of single-line quotations" Aathichoodi"
Pillai Lokacharya	12th century CE	Vishishtadvaita	
Vardhamana Upadhyaya	12th century CE	Nyaya	
Ramanuja	12th century CE	Vishishtadvaita	
Mamaidev	12th century CE		
Basava	12th century CE	Shaivism	Founder of Lingayatism.
Siddheshwar	12th century CE	Shaivism	
Parasara Bhattar	12th century CE	Vishishtadvaita	
Naropa	12th century CE	Buddhism	
Vedanta Desika	12th century CE	Vishishtadvaita	
Vidyaranya	12th century CE	Advaita	
Khana	12th century CE		
Akka Mahadevi	12th century CE	Shaivism	
Hemachandra	12th century CE	Jainism	
Shri Harsha	12th century CE		
Abhayakaragupta	12th century CE	Buddhism	
Jayaratha	12th century CE		
Someshvara III	12th century CE		
Madhvacharya	13th century CE	Dwaita	Considered the chief proponent of Tattvavada
Vimuktatman	13th century CE	Advaita	
Yādavaprakāśa	13th century CE	Advaita	
Dnyaneshwar	13th century CE	Advaita	
Akshobhya Tirtha	13th century CE	Dwaita	
Narahari Tirtha	13th century CE	Dwaita	
Meykandar	13th century CE	Shaivism.	
Chakradhar Swami	13th century CE	Vaishnavism	
Trivikrama Panditacharya	13th century CE	Dwaita	Disciple of Madhvacharya
Amalananda	13th century CE	Advaita	
Vishnu Tirtha	13th century CE	Dwaita	Brother of Madhvacharya
Prakasatman	13th century CE	Advaita	
Padmanabha Tirtha	13th century CE	Dwaita	Disciple of Madhvacharya
Narayana Panditacharya	13th century CE	Dwaita	
Jayatirtha	14th century CE	Dwaita	Chief commentator par excellence on the Sarvamoola Granthas.
Lalla	14th century CE	Pratyabhijna	
Madhava Tirtha	14th century CE	Dwaita	Third pontiff of Madhvacharya peetha.
Sripadaraja	14th century CE	Dwaita	Considered as one of the founder of Haridasa movement
Kavindra Tirtha	14th century CE	Dwaita	
Gangesha Upadhyaya	14th century CE	Nyaya	He established the Navya-Nyāya ("New Logic") school
Vyasaraja Tirtha	16th century CE	Dvaita	Third saint of Munitrayam, and known for the 'Vyasatraya', making him one of the foremost dialecticians of Tattvavada.
Vijnanabhiksu	16th century CE (?)	Samkhya, Yoga, Advaita Vedanta	Hindu philosopher who wrote commentaries integrating Vedanta, Samkhya, and Yoga; known for Avibhaga Advaita (indistinguishable non-dualism).

== See also ==
- Indian philosophy
- Hindu philosophy
- Buddhist philosophy
- Jain philosophy
- Karma
- Samsara
- Moksha
- Artha
