= List of teachers of Nyaya =

This is a list of teachers of Nyaya (including Navya-Nyāya), one of the six astika Hindu philosophical systems.

1. Akṣapāda Gautama
2. Vātsyāyana
3. Udyotakara
4. Jayanta Bhatta
5. Vācaspati Miśra
6. Bhāsavarajña
7. Udayana
8. Gangeśa Upādhyāya
9. Vardhamāna Upādhyāya
10. Ayachi Mishra
11. Pakṣadhara Miśra
12. Vāsudeva Sārvabhauma
13. Padmanābha Miśra
14. Raghunātha Śiromaṇi
15. Janakinath Bhattacharya
16. Kanad Tarkavagish
17. Rambhadra Sārvabhauma
18. Haridas Bhattacharya
19. Mathuranath Tarkavagish
20. Jagadish Tarkalankar
21. Jaygopal Tarkalankar
22. Gadadhar Bhattacharya
23. Annaṁbhaṭṭa
24. Viśvanātha
25. Radhamohan Vidyavachaspati Goswami
26. Kalishankar Siddhantavagish (1781–1830)
27. Golaknath Nyayaratna (1807–1855)
