= Tarka Shastra =

Indian science of dialectics, logic and reasoning

Tarka Shastra (तर्कशास्त्र, IAST: tarkaśāstra) is a Sanskrit term for the philosophy of dialectics, logic and reasoning, and art of debate that analyzes the nature and source of knowledge and its validity. Shastra in Sanskrit means that which gives teaching, instruction or command. Tarka means debate or an argument. According to one reckoning, there are six shastras. Vyākaraṇa is one of them. Four of the shastras are particularly important: Vyākaraṇa, Mīmāṃsā, Tarka, and Vedanta.

Tarka shastra has concepts called purva paksha and apara paksha. When one raises a point (purva paksha) the other party criticizes it (apara paksha). Then the debate starts. Each one tries to support his point of view by getting various references. The meaning of the word tarka also is specific, in that it does not imply a pure logical analysis but a complex activity of discourse guided by strict definitions and goals.

Tarka-Sangraha is a foundational text followed as guidelines for logic and discourse ever since it was composed in the second half of 17th century CE. Tarka may be translated as "hypothetical argument". Tarka is the process of questioning and cross-questioning that leads to a particular conclusion. It is a form of supposition that can be used as an aid to the attainment of valid knowledge.

There are several scholars renowned as well-versed in Tarka shastra: Adi Shankara (sixth century CE), Udyotakara (Nyāyavārttika, 6th–7th century), Vācaspati Miśra (Tatparyatika, 9th century), Ramanujacharya (9th century), Udayanacharya (Tātparyaparishuddhi, 10th century), Jayanta Bhatta (Nyāyamanjari, 9th century), Madhvacharya (13th century), Visvanatha (Nyāyasūtravṛtti, 17th century), Rādhāmohana Gosvāmī (Nyāyasūtravivarana, 18th century), and Kumaran Asan (1873–1924). Paruthiyur Krishna Sastri (1842–1911) and Sengalipuram Anantarama Dikshitar (1903–1969) specialized in Vyākaraṇa, Mīmāṃsā and Tarka shastra.

== Bibliography ==
JSTOR:

- Tucci, Giuseppe (July 1929). "Buddhist Logic before Diṅnāga (Asaṅga, Vasubandhu, Tarka-śāstras)". The Journal of the Royal Asiatic Society of Great Britain and Ireland. 61 (3). Cambridge University Press: 451–488. doi:10.1017/S0035869X00151524. JSTOR 25193933. OCLC 729532565.
- Vassiliev, Boris (1937). "'Ju-shih Lun': A Logical Treatise Ascribed to Vasubandhu". Bulletin of the School of Oriental Studies, University of London. 8 (4). Cambridge University Press: 1013–1037. doi:10.1017/s0041977x00082367. JSTOR 3488492.

WorldCat:

- Krishna Jain (2011). Tarka-śāstra: eka rūpa-rekhā (Raj Verma Sinha, translator) [A textbook of logic: an introduction]. Naī Dillī: Ḍī. Ke. Priṇṭavarlḍa. ISBN 9788124604274, ISBN 8124604274,OCLC 769743700 [language: Hindi, translated from 2007 English original ISBN 8124604266, ISBN 9788124604267, OCLC 636929116]
- Pavitra Kumāra Śarmā (2007). Tarka śāstra. Jayapura: Haṃsā Prakāśana. OCLC 309717739 [language: Hindi]
- Gulābarāya. Tarka śāstra. Kāśī: Nāgarīpracāriṇī Sabhā. OCLC 33938711 [language: Hindi] (on Hindu logic)
- George William Brown (1915). Hindi logic. Jubbulpore: Christian Mission Press. OCLC 82179416 [language: Hindi]
