= Buddhism and Eastern religions =

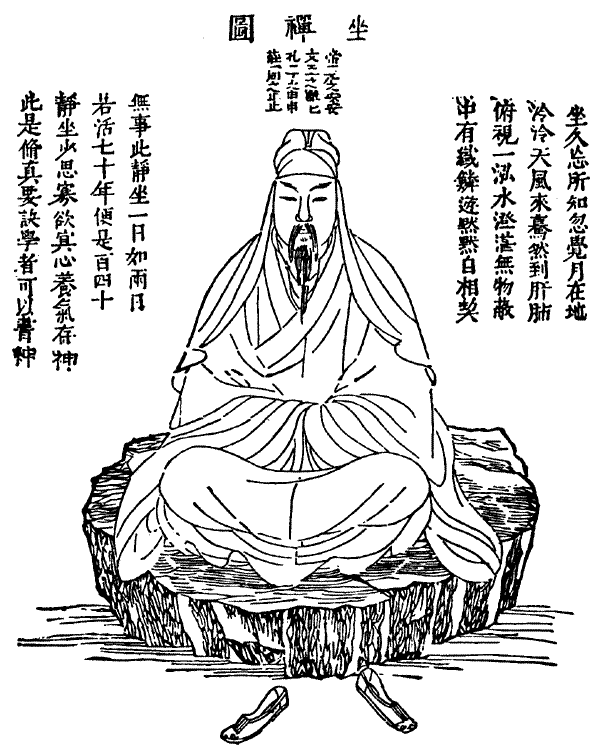
"Gathering the Light" from the Taoist book The Secret of the Golden Flower, translated by C. G. Jung and Richard Wilhelm

Buddhism's history spans over 2,500 years, originating from the Indian subcontinent in the 5th century BCE and spreading to East Asia by the 2nd century CE. Teachings of the Buddha were introduced over time, as a response to brahmanical teachings. Buddhism relies on the continual analysis of the self, rather than being defined by a ritualistic system, or singular set of beliefs. The intersections of Buddhism with other Eastern religions, such as Taoism, Shinto, Hinduism, and Bon illustrate the interconnected ideologies that interplay along the path of enlightenment. Buddhism and eastern religions tend to share the world-view that all sentient beings are subject to a cycle of rebirth that has no clear end.

== Taoism ==
The ideologies and traditions of Taoism have adapted over time in response to Buddhist practices. Taoist philosophy stems from a mixture of early mythology and folk religious practices. The Tao ideology dates back to the seventh century BC, existing long before the Taoists formed into an organized religious collective. While Buddhism provides an elaborate cosmology and a detailed theory about the afterlife, Taoism meets other needs.

The principle focus of Taoism is the path of Tao, an all encompassing, formless power, that brings all things together in an eternal cycle. The Tao provides followers a path to reach understanding of one's individual place within the world. The relationship between Taoism and Buddhism is complexly intertwined. The arrival of Buddhism forced Taoism to restructure into a more organized religion, in response to the existential questions that Buddhism raised. Competition between Buddhism and Taoism is said to have inspired beneficial advancements in the field of Chinese medicine.

Early Buddhism was originally not clearly defined by Taoism; some scriptures were mistranslated in Chinese using incorrect Taoist vocabulary, which caused discrepancies between various accounts. There is an ideological crossover found between Buddhist and Taoist systems of influence. Chan Buddhism in particular holds many beliefs in common with the philosophy of Taoism.

Daoist (Taoist) simplicity stimulated Chan's abandonment of Buddhist theory and was accompanied by another traditional Daoist feature—the emphasis on total absorption in practice of a highly cultivated skill.

The coexistence of Chinese Buddhism and Taoism has also resulted in various Buddhist deities being adopted into the Taoist pantheon, and vice versa. For example, in Taoism, the Chinese Buddhist deva and Bodhisattva Marici is often syncretized with the Taoist goddess Doumu, who is regarded as the personification of the Big Dipper as well as the feminine aspect of the cosmic God of Heaven. In another example, the Taoist god of war and fraternity, Guan Yu, has been adopted by Buddhism and he is widely venerated as Sangharama Bodhisattva (伽蓝菩萨; 伽藍菩薩; Qiélán Púsà), a Bodhisattva or deva who serves as a dharmapala of Buddhist monasteries. According to Buddhist legends, in 592, the spirit of Guan Yu manifested himself one night before the Tiantai Patriarch and founder Zhiyi and requested the master to teach him about the dharma. After receiving Buddhist teachings from the master, Guan Yu took refuge in the triple gems and also requested the Five Precepts, making a vow to become a guardian of temples and the dharma. The syncretism between Chinese Esoteric Buddhism and Taoism was particularly extensive. For instance, the nine-fold configuration of the Mandala of the Two Realms in Zhenyan and Shingon Buddhism was influenced and adopted from the Taoist Lo Shu Square and the I Ching.

== Confucianism ==
Confucianism in particular raised fierce opposition to Buddhism in early history, principally because it perceived Buddhism to be a nihilistic worldview, with a negative impact on society at large. "The Neo-Confucianists had therefore to attack Buddhist cosmological views by affirming, in the first place, the reality and concreteness of the universe and of man."

Some Neo-Confucianist philosophers specifically attacked Buddhism from four different main view-points. These four viewpoints include: historical/textual formulations, cosmology, metaphysics, and ethics. The philosophers known for these critiques were Ch'eng Hao, Ch'eng I, and Chu Hsi. These, of course, were not the only Neo-Confucianists philosophers to speak out against Buddhism, but they are surely a part of the possibility of why Neo-Confucianism succeeded in over-powering a very strong Buddhist system from the Chinese.

The confrontation of Buddhist ideologies had already been happening for a while. There were questions Neo-Confucianists raised that made Buddhists not able to formally answer and attack back, which was a shift of from Buddhism being the leading ideology in East Asia to something else taking that place.

During the Song Dynasty rule, an economic and territorial shift occurred where they had lost the North of China to the Jin. As a result, the Songs in the South were dedicated to developing a booming economy. Because of that, a commercial and social revolution took place, directly affecting both Buddhism and Confucianism. The difference between the two was how each of them handled it. While the Song Buddhist monks had seemingly forgotten the social applications early Buddhist Chinese monks had practiced, they had lived farther and farther away in isolation within their respected temples and monasteries, which the Song rulers started look down as too expensive to maintain & putting a strain on the royal treasury. In response to that, Confucianists filled the void that Song Buddhists had left, by occupying posts within the Imperial bureaucracy.

Chu Hsi is known to be the “great synthesizer” of early Neo-Confucianism. He used an organized and developed process in order to attack Buddhism. Which proved to be successful. Chu Hsi was actually in a more privileged position than his forerunners as the Cheng brothers had already laid down the foundation of the Ch’eng Chu school.

== Shinto ==
Before Prince Shotoku made Buddhism the national religion of Japan, many opposed the integration of Buddhism into Japan. Once this forced integration occurred, Japan synchronized Buddhism with its native religion Shinto, resulting in a unique sect of Buddhism existing only on the East Asian Island.

In the Japanese religion of Shinto, the long coexistence of Buddhism and Shinto resulted in the merging of Shinto and Buddhism. Gods in Shinto were given a position similar to that of Hindu gods in Buddhism. Moreover, because the Buddha Vairochana's symbol was the sun, many equated Amaterasu, the sun goddess, as his previous bodhisattva reincarnation. According to Helen Hardacre, by the Heian period, a theory named wakō dōjin (和光同塵) had emerged. The Buddha and Kami had taken on a new form as saviors of man, who "dim their light and mingle with the dust of the world". This not only relates the two religions, but demonstrates a marked difference in status between the two deities at this period in time. The later Tokugawa Shogunate era saw a revival of Shinto, and some Shinto scholars began to argue that Buddhas were previous incarnations of Shinto gods, reversing the traditional positions of the two religions. Shinto and Buddhism were officially separated during the Meiji Restoration and the brief, but socially transformative rise of State Shinto followed. In post-war modern Japan, most families count themselves as being of both religions, despite the idea of "official separation".

As time went on, the Japanese became more and more accustomed to including both the kami and Buddhist ideas in their spiritual lives. Philosophers put forward the idea that the kami were "transformations of the Buddha manifested in Japan to save all sentient beings".

In addition, Buddhism played an important part in the religious legitimation of Japanese emperors via Shinto.

It is noteworthy that the Sui were the first Chinese dynasty with which the newly emergent centralising Japanese state came into contact, so the practice of using Buddhism as an officially sanctioned religion would have been demonstrated to the Japanese as a political reality.

The interplay between Taoism, Buddhism, and Shinto in China and Japan stimulated the adoption of the Chinese practice of state-sanctioned religion and religious legitimation through association with divinity by the Japanese government. The official implementation of the term tennō (天皇) to refer to the Japanese emperor is also widely agreed to take place during the latter part of the 7th century, as a result of these interactions.

== Muism ==
When Buddhism was introduced in Korea, its temples were built on or near the shaman mountain-spirit shrines. Still today, one can see buildings at these Buddhist temple sites dedicated to the shaman mountain-spirits Sansin (Korean: 산신). Most Buddhist temples in Korea have a Sansin-gak (Korean: 산신각), the choice of preference over other shrines, typically a small shrine room set behind and to the side of the other buildings. It is also common for the sansingak to be at a higher elevation than the other shrine rooms, just as the mountain itself towers above the temple complex. The sansin-gak maybe a traditional wooden structure with a tile roof, or in more modern and less wealth temples, a more simple and utilitarian room. Inside will be a waist height shrine with either a statue and mural painting, or just a mural painting. Offerings of candles, incense, water and fruit are commonly supplemented with alcoholic drinks, particularly Korea’s rustic rice wine makgeolli. This further serves to illustrate the non-Buddhist nature of this deity, even when he resides inside a temple. And yet, on the floor of this small shine room, one will frequently see a monk’s cushion and moktak: evidence of the regular Buddhist ceremonies held there. Sansin may not be enshrined in a separate shrine, but in a Samseonggak or in the Buddha hall, to one side of the main shrine. Sansin shrines can also be found independent of Buddhist temples.

== Hinduism ==
Having both originated from the same place, Hinduism and Buddhism have shared India and influenced each other over centuries. Both religions have a long history of engaging in debate over various issues, with Buddhist notions of sunyata & anatta being the main focal points of criticism from Hindu schools like Nyaya, Mimamsa, & especially Vedanta, which puts great emphasis on the doctrine of atman, in addition to the Buddhist rejection (see dependent origination) of the Hindu paramatman. The Advaita Vedanta scholar Vidyaranya highlights the irreconcilable differences between the two systems in his celebrated work Panchadashi as follows -

The Atman knows everything that can be known. There is no other knower than the Atman. That Atman which is of the nature of consciousness is distinct from the known and unknown.
Persons who perceive things and yet complain that they do not experience them are merely lumps of clay in human form. How can scriptures teach such persons? .....For the fact of one's existence cannot form the subject matter of dispute for anybody. If one begins to have doubts on one's own existence who can be the disputant? Unless one is under delusion, nobody would like to argue that he himself is non-existent. Therefore the Vedas declare the untenability of the position of one who argues the non-existence of self.

— Vidyaranya, Panchadashi, Chapter 3

== See also ==
- Three teachings
- Buddhism and Christianity
- Buddhism and Tengrism
- Buddhism and Jainism
- Buddhism and psychology
- Buddhism and science
