= Bhavivikta =

Bhavivikta (c. 520-580 AD) was an Indian commentator and logician of the Nyaya School. He is mentioned by the Buddhist writer Santaraksita as one of the major rivals of Dharmakirti. He is said to have written a commentary on a Nyayabhasya, presumably Vatsyayana’s.

== Views ==
The views which are attributed to him by Santaraksita are the following:

- Since the ego-making faculty (ahamkara) is self-cognizable, the self is perceptible and can be proved thereby.
- We can sometimes perceive substances without their qualities, e.g., in a shady place.
- There is a distinct category of universals. Universals are the causes of names and concepts, and they are spoken about and known in a different way from individuals.
- A view on perception.
- The "reaffirmation" (upanaya) is an indispensable member of the inference pattern.
- A view on the prakaranasama fallacy.
