= Purva paksha =

Sanskrit logical device

Pūrvapakṣa (Sanskrit: पूर्वपक्ष), sometimes also transliterated as poorva paksha or purva paksha, literally means 'former view/position'. It is a tradition in the debates of Indian Logicians. It involves building a deep familiarity with the opponent's point of view before criticising it, similar to the modern day device of steelmanning. The purva paksha approach has been used by Adi Shankaracharya as well as Ramanuja and later acharyas in their works.

In ancient Indian jurisprudence, purva paksha referred to the complaint, with other parts of a trial consisting of the uttar (the later), the kriyaa (trial or investigation by the court), and the nirnaya (verdict or decision).

The concept is explained as follows by scholars Gary A. Tubb and Emery R. Boose:

The view of the commentator and his school is known as the siddhānta, lit., "the demonstrated conclusion." Opposing views are included under the term pūrvapakṣa, lit., "the prior view." The pūrvapakṣa may be the established doctrine of another school, or it may be any question or doubt anticipated by the commentator. The dialogue that leads to proof of the siddhānta may take several forms. Often a problem is posed, a pūrvapakṣa is put forth, and a debate develops between the pūrvapakṣin (the upholder of the pūrvapakṣa) and the siddhāntin (the upholder of the siddhānta, i.e., the comentator) that eventually leads to confirmation of the siddhtinta. Sometimes the siddhānta is stated first, only to be attacked by the pūrvapakṣin and defended in the ensuing debate. In longer arguments the siddhānta may be confronted with a series of pūrvapakṣas.

== See also ==
- Tarka sastra
