= Pakayajna =

Hindu ritual

The Pakayajna (Sanskrit: पाकयज्ञ, romanized: Pāka-yajñās) or Pakayaga (ISO: Pāka-yaga) is a Hindu ritual. It is a type of Yajna associated with the Vedic sacrifices of cooked food offering, and regarded as an obligatory ritual (nitya-karma) for a householder.

The term "paka" means "cooked" or "prepared". Unlike other types of sacrifices, such as Haviryaga, which involves the offering of uncooked food, a Pakayajna utilizes cooked food material such as bhat. The food (rice of other grains) is cooked in a pot made out of clay called "sthālī", and then offered in the yajna fire during the ritual.

== Types ==
The seven types of Pakayajna are:

- Aṣṭakā
- Pārvaṇa
- Śrāddha
- Śrāvaṇī
- Āgrahāyaṇī
- Caitrī
- Āśviyujī

== See also ==
- Vedas
- Yajna
