= Sankhyayana Brahmana =

Brahmana text of Rigaveda

Information
- Religion: Sanatana Hinduism
- Author: Vedic sages Kaushitaki and Sankhyayana
- Language: Sanskrit
- Period: Vedic Period
- Chapters: 30
- Earlier name "Kaushitaki Brahmana"
- Second survived Brahmana text of Rigaveda

Sankhyayana Brahmana (Sanskrit: शाङ्खायनब्राह्मणम्) (Romanised: Śāṅkhyāyana Brāhmaṇa) is an ancient Brahmana text of Rigveda. It is also called the Kaushitaki Brahmana. The text is associated with Baskala Shakha of Rigaveda. The text is attributed to the Vedic sage Kaushitaki and his disciple Sankhyayana.

== Description ==
Sankhyayana Brahmana is the second available and preserved Brahmana text of the Rigaveda. The text is divided into 30 chapters and 226 Khandas. It is said that Kaushitaki was the teacher of Sankhyayana. He imparted the knowledge of the text to his disciple Sankhyayana. Then Sankhyayana nominated the name of the text as Kaushitaki Brahmana after his teacher name. But later the text was called as Sankhyayana Brahmana. The text is also mentioned in the commentary of Brahman Sutra by Shankracharya. Similarly the Vedic sage and Sanskrit grammarian Panini in his text Astadhyayai mentioned about the text.

It is said that the text Sankhyayana Brahmana is generally not mentioned in Puranas but in Agni Purana its mention is found at the second shloka of chapter 271.

"bhedaḥ sāṅkhyāyanaścaika āśvalāyano dvitīyakaḥ, śatāni daśa mantrāṇāṃ brāhmaṇā dvisahasrakaṃ"

— Agni Purana - 271.2

In the Sankhyayana Brahmana, the rules and instructions of human conduct have been described. Apart from the human conduct, it also describes some astronomical events in its passages. The first six chapters of the text describe about the Yajna of food and the remaining chapters describe about the Yajna of Soma. The Soma Yajna in the Vedic tradition is considered as the major subject of the text.

== Contents ==
The chapters of the text is called Adhyaya. There are 30 Adhyayas in the text.

=== Chapter 1 ===
The first Adhyaya having five verses discusses about the establishment of Agni. The verses are attributed to the sacred offerings to different forms of Agni, the attainment of pre and post offerings by Agni, the time of re-establishment of Agni, pre and post offerings and the portion of butters. The last verse is attributed to the Vibhaktis and offerings to Goddess Aditi.

=== Chapter 2 ===
The second Adhyaya or chapter of the text have nine verses. The chapter discusses about the Agnihotra.

=== Chapter 3 ===
The third chapter discusses about the offerings to the new and the full moon. It contains nine verses.

=== Chapter 4 ===
The fourth chapter of the text discusses about some special Yajnas attributed to sages. There fourteen verses in the chapter.

=== Chapter 5 ===
The fifth chapter discusses about the four monthly Yajnas. In this chapter there are ten verses attributed to Viswadevas, Varunapraghasas, Sakamedhas and father, etc.

=== Chapter 6 ===
The sixth chapter discusses about the Brahmin priest. There are fifteen verses in this chapter which discusses about the activities of Prajapati, part of the Brahmin priests and Haviryajna.

=== Onward Chapters upto Chapter 30 ===
The chapters onwards to the sixth chapter discuss about the Yajnas related to the Soma. These Yajnas are called as Somayajna.
