= Vātsyāyana =

Indian logician and author of Kamasutra from a courtly lineage

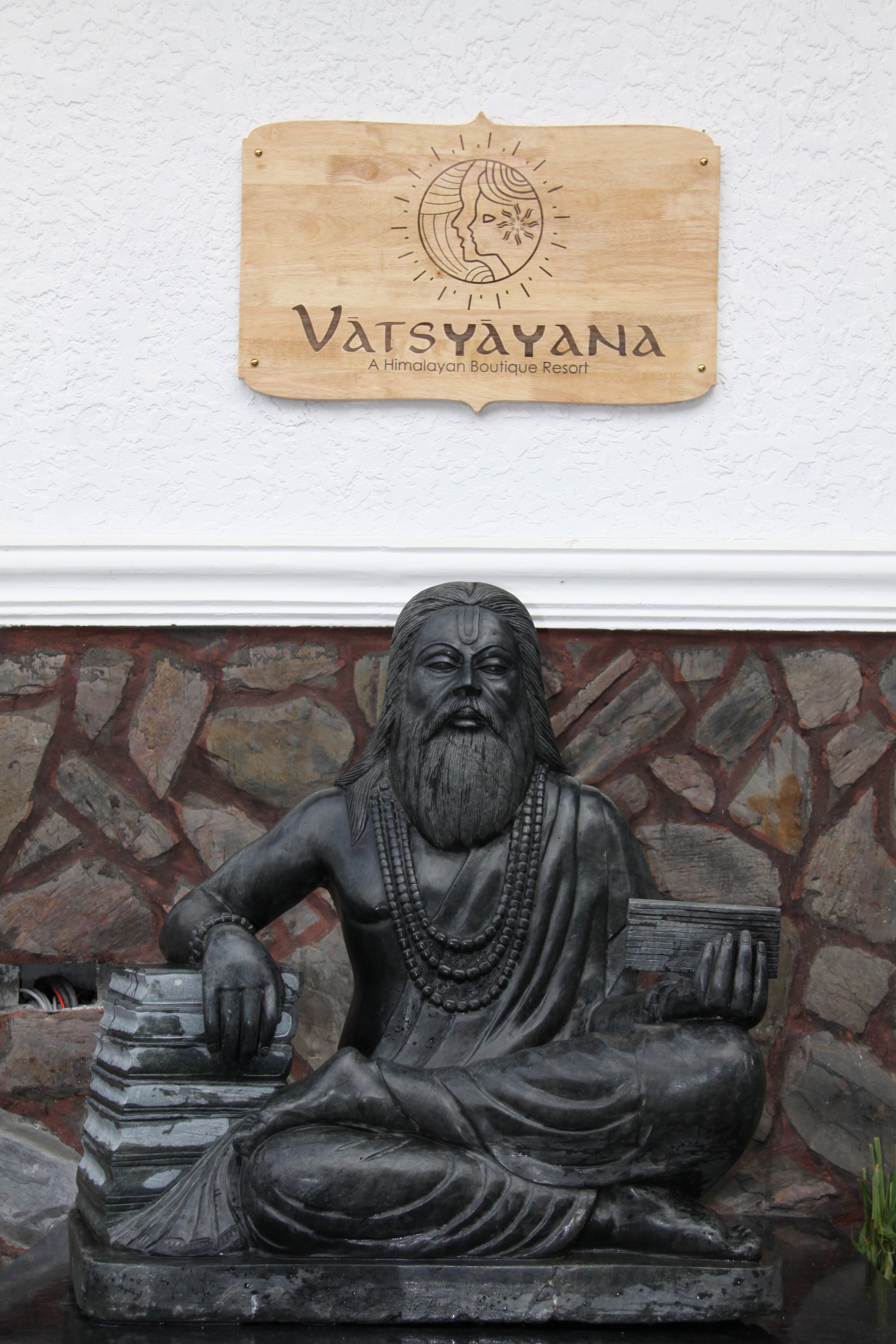
- Occupation: Philosopher
- Writing career
- Subject: Aspects of Hindu philosophy pertaining to pleasure-oriented faculties of human life
- Notable work: Kama Sutra

Mallanāga Vātsyāyana (Sanskrit : वात्स्यायन) was an ancient Indian philosopher, known for authoring the Kama Sutra. He lived in India during the second or third century CE, probably in Pataliputra (modern day Patna in Bihar).

He is not to be confused with Pakṣilasvāmin Vātsyāyana, the author of Nyāya Sutra Bhāshya, the first preserved commentary on Gotama's Nyāya Sutras.

== Biography ==
Basudeva Vatsayana was the father of Mallanaga Vatsayana. Vātsyāyana's interest in refined human love, including sexual behaviour, as a means of fulfilment, was recorded in his treatise Kama Sutra. Mallanaga Vatsayana's key disciple and son was Achutya Vatsayana, whose son was Kalyana Vatsayana, who was mentored by his own grandsire Mallanaga Vatsayana.

At the close of the Kama Sutra, this is what he writes about himself:

After reading and considering the works of Babhravya and other ancient authors, and thinking over the meaning of the rules given by them, this treatise was composed, according to the precepts of the Holy Writ, for the benefit of the world, by Vatsyayana, while leading the life of a religious student at Benares, and wholly engaged in the contemplation of the Deity. This work is not to be used merely as an instrument for satisfying our desires. A person acquainted with the true principles of this science, who preserves his Dharma (virtue or religious merit), his Artha (worldly wealth) and his Kama (pleasure or sensual gratification), and who has regard to the customs of the people, is sure to obtain the mastery over his senses. In short, an intelligent and knowing person attending to Dharma and Artha and also to Kama, without becoming the slave of his passions, will obtain success in everything that he may do.

Some believe that he must have lived between the 1st and 6th century CE, on the following grounds: He mentions that Satakarni Satavahana, a king of Kuntala, killed his wife, Malayevati, with an instrument called Katari by striking her in the passion of love. Vatsyayana quotes this case to warn people of the danger arising from some old customs of striking women when under the influence of sexual passion. This king of Kuntal is believed to have lived and reigned, consequently Vatsyayana must have lived after him. On the other hand, another author, Varahamihira, in the eighteenth chapter of his "Brihatsanhita", discusses of the science of love, and appears to have borrowed largely from Vatsyayana on the subject. Some believe that Varahamihira lived during the 6th century and therefore Vatsyayana must have written his works before the 6th century.

== See also ==
- Vatsyayana cipher
