= Āgamaḍambara =

9th-century Sanskrit play by Jayanta Bhatta

The Sanskrit play Āgamaḍambara (अागमडम्बर) satirizes various religions in Kashmir and their place in the politics of King Shankaravarman (883–902).

Bhatta Jayanta’s strategy is to take a characteristic figure of the target religion and show that he is a rogue, using reasoning or some fundamental ideas connected with the doctrines of that very religion. This way he makes a laughingstock of both its followers and their tenets. The leading character, Sankarshana, is a young and dynamic orthodox graduate of Vedic studies, whose career starts as a glorious campaign against the heretic Buddhists, Jains and other heterodox sects. By the end of the play he realizes that the interests of the monarch do not encourage such inquisitional rigor and the story ends in a great festival of tolerance and compromise.

== English translations ==
Much Ado about Religion by Csaba Dezső, Clay Sanskrit Library, 2005.
