= Tetralemma =

Logic System in India

The tetralemma is a figure that features prominently in the logic of India.

== Definition ==
It states that with reference to any logical proposition (or axiom) X, there are four possibilities:

$X$ (affirmation)
$\neg X$ (negation)
$X \land\neg X$ (both)
$\neg (X \lor \neg X)$ (neither)

== Catuskoti ==
The history of the fourfold negation, the Catuskoti (Sanskrit), is evident in the logico-epistemological tradition of India and given the categorical nomenclature Indian Logic in Western discourse. Subsumed within the auspice of Indian logic, 'Buddhist logic' has been particularly focused on the employment of the fourfold negation, as evidenced by the traditions of Nagarjuna and the Madhyamaka, particularly the school of Madhyamaka given the retroactive nomenclature of Prasangika by the Tibetan Buddhist logico-epistemological tradition. The tetralemma was also used as a form of inquiry rather than logic in the Nasadiya Sukta of Rigveda (creation hymn) and appears to be rarely used as a tool of logic before Buddhism.

== Modern applications ==
The tetralemma has been rediscovered in management and organisation studies as an analytical tool for navigating dilemmas. In this context, it is used to move beyond binary decision logics by considering not only two opposing options, but also their combination and their negation. Scholars have applied the tetralemma to issues such as family-business tensions, organisational purpose, and governance, where competing rationalities often cannot be adequately addressed through either–or reasoning. The framework is particularly relevant in analyses of organisations operating across multiple institutional and functional contexts, where mutually incompatible demands must be processed simultaneously.

== See also ==
- Catuṣkoṭi, a similar concept in Indian philosophy
- De Morgan's laws
- Dialetheism
- Logical connective
- Paraconsistent logic
- Prasangika
- Pyrrhonism
- Semiotic square
- Two-truths doctrine
