= Debates in ancient India =

There was, for a considerable period of time, a very lively and extensively practiced tradition of formal debates in ancient India. These debates were conducted, sometimes with royal patronage, to examine various religious, philosophical, moral and doctrinal issues. The corpus of knowledge on conducting a successful debate was referred to as vādavidyā and several manuals dealing with this discipline had been produced. It was from these debates that the Indian tradition of logic and allied investigations were evolved and developed. The antiquity of this tradition can be traced to the Vedic period. For example, Brihadaranyaka Upanishad, a late-Vedic, pre-Buddhist text, has references to King Janaka as not only organizing and patronizing debates between the sages and priests but also as participating in such debates. Women also used to participate in these debates. Gargi was a woman scholar who used to participate in the debates in King Janaka's court.

Though debate was popular at the time of the Upanisads, there was no theory of debates during that period. Such a theory evolved along with the spread of the teachings of Buddha, Mahavira, and other ascetics or religious reformers. By the third and second century BCE, monks and priests were required to have a training in the art of conducting a successful debate. Several debate manuals were written in different sectarian schools. But these early manuals written in Sanskrit have all been lost. However, the nature of these manuals could be glimpsed from Buddhist Chinese sources as well as from Pali sources like the Kathavatthu.

== Theory of debate in Charaka Samhitha ==
The earliest available treatises in Sanskrit in which the principles of debates are systematically explored are, strangely, two texts on Ayurveda, namely Charaka Samhita and Sushruta Samhita.

These are the two foundational Hindu texts of this field that have survived from ancient India. Charaka Samhita is a voluminous work containing 120 chapters divided into eight parts. In the third part, called Vimanasthana, along with other topics such as, training of a physician, ethics of medical practice, pathology, diet and nourishment, taste of medicines, etc., there is also a discussion on the principles of debate. The related doctrines are treated in Caraka-samhita under three heads, namely, 1) Karyabhinirvrtti, the aggregate of resources for the accomplishment of an action (2) Pariksa, the standard of examination, and (3) Sambhasha-vidhi, or vada-vidhi, the method of debate. This is followed by detailed discussions on these three topics. For example, there is a discussion on the various resources that are to be examined to accomplish an action. These resources include Karana (the actor, or agent who accomplishes an action), Karya (the action), Karya-phala (the effect), Desa (the place of the action), Kala (the time of the action), Pravrtti (the activity or exertion put forth for achieving the action), etc. The second head, Pariksa, deals with the standard of examination. These standards are aptopadesa (reliable assertion) pratyaksa (perception), anumana (inference), yukti (reasoning). The discussion under the third head is much more elaborate.

The examination of vada-vidhi begins by dividing debates into two classes, namely, anuloma sambhasha (peaceful debate) and vigrihya sambhasha (hostile debate). The respondents are then classified as superior, equal and inferior. Also, the assembly witnessing the debate is classified as learned and ignorant. Each of these is then further classified as friendly, indifferent or hostile. There are suggestions as to how to handle the debate depending on the nature of the respondents and of the assembly. The treatise then goes on to give a list of 44 items a thorough knowledge of which is essential for the successful conduct of a debate.

== Theory of debate in Nyayasutras ==
The Nyayasutras contain a more systematic and improved version of the theory of debate than the one presented in Charaka Samhitha. The term katha (meaning speech or discourse), is the preferred term to denote philosophical debate in Nyaya literature. The Nyayasutras mention three kinds of debate, namely, vada, jalpa, and vitanda. The first variety is between a proponent and his teacher or somebody with a similar status. The other two are between those who want victory. The goal of the first is establishment of truth or an accepted doctrine, that of the other two is victory. The first corresponds to Caraka's friendly or congenial debate, and the other two to his hostile debate.

=== Vada, the honest debate ===
Vada, the good or honest debate, is constituted by the following characteristics:

- Establishment (of the thesis) and refutation (of the counter-thesis) should be based upon adequate evidence or means for knowledge (pramana) as well as upon (proper) hypothetical or indirect reasoning (tarka).
- The conclusion should not entail contradiction with any tenet or accepted doctrine (siddhanta).
- Each side should use the well-known five steps of the demonstration of an argument explicitly.
- They should clearly recognize a thesis to be defended and a counter thesis to be refuted.

=== Jalpa, the bad debate ===
Jalpa is defined in Nyayasutra as a debate where, among the stated characteristics of the first type of debate, only such characteristics as would seem appropriate would be applicable. In addition, the debater can use, for the establishment of his own position and for the refutation of the opponent's thesis, such means as quibbling, illegitimate rejoinders and any kind of clincher. Three kinds of quibbling are listed, twenty-four kinds of illegitimate rejoinders and twenty-two kinds of clinchers.

=== Vitanda, the wrangling debate ===
The third debate mentioned in the Nyayasutra is called vitanda, which has sometimes been translated as wrangling. It is defined as a debate where no counter-thesis is established. In other words, the debater here tries to ensure victory simply by refuting the thesis put forward by the other side. It is sometimes claimed to be a type of bad debate, for the only goal is victory, as in the second type, and the use of such trickery as quibbling and illegitimate rejoinder is allowed.

== Debate in Tibetan Buddhism ==
The debate traditions of ancient India are still practiced in modern times by Tibetan Buddhists. Monks debate one another in order to sharpen the mind and defeat misconceptions. They may spend years in university studying debate as part of their education, and learning how to be precise and logical with their arguments.

Debates between monks are energetic and performative, with formalized roles and expressions. The defender sits and offers formulaic responses, while the challenger stands and asks questions, which are punctuated by a clap at the end.
