= Sankhyayana =

Vedic Sage

Acharya Sankhyayana
- आचार्य शाङ्खायन
- Occupations: Vedic sage, Philosopher, Teacher, Author and Seer of Vedas
- Era: Vedic Period
- Known for: Sankhyayana Brahmana of Rigveda

Notes
- The author of Kaushitaki or Sankhyayana Brahmana

Sankhyayana (Sanskrit: शाङ्खायन) was a Vedic sage mentioned in the text Rigaveda. He was the sage of Vashishtha lineage. He was the author of the text Kaushitaki Brahmana of Rigaveda which later called as Sankhyayana Brahmana.

== Description ==
The Vedic sage Sankhyayana had been mentioned in several ancient texts of Hinduism. He was the Acharya of the notable sages Parashara and Brihspati, etc. In Srimad Bhagavatam Purana, he is mentioned as the listener of the text from the sage Sanatkumara. He was the chief of the transcendental sages including Maitreya, Parashara and Brihspati, when the sage Sanatkumara was describing Vishnu to them. He inquired about the knowledge of Srimad Bhagavatam to Sanatkumara. Then Sanatkumara explained the text Srimad Bhagavatam to him. In the Vedic tradition, a Griha Sutra text is attributed to Sankhyayana called as Sankhyayana Griha Sutra. Similarly there is another text of Tantra Vidya attributed to him known as Sankhyayanatantram.

Hermann Oldenberg in his translation of the text "The Griha Sutra" had considered the proper name of Sankhyayana as Suyajña.
