= Anviksiki =

Ānvīkṣikī is a term in Sanskrit denoting roughly the "science of inquiry" and it should have been recognized in India as a distinct branch of learning as early as 650 BCE. However, over the centuries its meaning and importance have undergone considerable variations. In the earliest period, the term was used to denote Atma-vidya, the science of the soul, in contrast to Adhyatma-vidya, the spiritual science, or Brahma-vidya, the divine science. In Manu Smriti the term Ānvīkṣikī has been used as equivalent to Atma-vidya and it has been described as a branch of the Vedas. In the fourth century BCE, Kautilya in his Arthashastra recognised it as a distinct branch of learning different from Vedas and other disciplines. Kautilya classifies all disciplines into four categories: scripture (the three Vedas, trayi), agriculture and commerce (varta), politics and public administration (danda-niti), and Ānvīkṣikī, the investigative reflective science. The distinction between Atma-vidya and Ānvīkṣikī is that while the former embodied certain dogmatic assertions about the nature of the soul, the latter contained reasons supporting those assertions. Thus Ānvīkṣikī dealt with two subjects, namely, atma, soul, and hetu, theory of reasons. The Samkhya, Yoga, and Lokayata, in so far as they treated of reasons affirming or denying the existence of soul, were included by Kautilya in the Ānvīkṣikī. Of the two subjects studied in the ambit of Ānvīkṣikī, the study of soul later developed and matured into a separate independent study described by the term Darsanas (meaning philosophy), and the theory of reasons was developed into an independent branch of study referred to as Nyaya or logic. This bifurcation of Ānvīkṣikī into philosophy and logic must have had its beginning in around 550 BCE with the exposition of the logical side of Ānvīkṣikī by Medhatithi Gautama. However the term Ānvīkṣikī has been in use in the general sense of a science embracing both the science of soul and the theory of reasons.

It is interesting to observe that when the part of Ānvīkṣikī dealing with the theory of reasons developed into logic, the term Ānvīkṣikī began to be used to denote in this exclusive sense also. For example, Manusamhita has used this term in this special sense of logic. Gautama-dharma-sutra, Ramayana, Mahabharata all have used the term Ānvīkṣikī in this special sense. Ānvīkṣikī in this special sense has also been called by several other names, namely, Hetu-sastra, Hetu-vidya, Tarka-sastra, Vada-vidya, and also by Nyaya-sastra.

== Teachers of Ānvīkṣikī ==
There are a few great teachers who wrote about and taught the doctrines of Ānvīkṣikī in the earliest sense of the term, that is, as a study of both philosophy and logic. Followers of the Charvaka school of Indian philosophy (c. 650 BCE), known for their materialistic doctrine, Kapila (c. 650–575 BCE), known for his doctrine of matter and soul, Dattatreya (c. 650 BCE), known for his parable of a tree, Punarvasu Atreya (c. 550 BCE), known for his dissertation on senses, Sulabha (c. 550 BCE), a lady ascetic known for canons of speech, Ashtavakra (c. 550–500 BCE) known as a violent debater, and Medhatithi Gautama (c. 550 BCE), known as the founder of Indian logic, are some of these great teachers.
