= Ramesvara Swami =

American Hare Krishna disciple

Ramesvara Das (IAST: Ramesvara dāsa), formerly Ramesvara Swami, was one of the leading disciples of A. C. Bhaktivedanta Swami Prabhupada and formerly a guru within the International Society of Krishna Consciousness.

Ramesvara, born Robert Grant, became an initiated disciple of Prabhupada on April 28, 1971, receiving his initiation by mail. From 1976-1986 Ramesvara was a member of ISKCON's Governing Body Commission (GBC) and became a trustee of the Bhaktivedanta Book Trust (BBT) in February 1975, working from its headquarters in Los Angeles. He later become head of the North American BBT. In 1987, the GBC accepted his resignation from all GBC management responsibilities within ISKCON. He never resigned from the BBT, as it was a lifetime appointment by the BBT founder, Prabhupada.
