= Udyotakara =

Philosopher of the Nyaya school of Indian philosophy

Udyotakara (or Uddyotakara) (c. 6th century CE) was a philosopher of the Nyaya school of Indian philosophy. Subandhu’s Vāsavadattā mentioned him as the rescuer of the Nyaya. He was a brahmin of Bharadvaja gotra and he belonged to the Pashupata sect. His philosophical treatise, the Nyāyavārttika was written to defend Pakṣilasvāmin Vātsyāyana's Nyāyabhāṣya against the criticisms made by Dignaga.

== See also ==
- List of teachers of Nyaya
