= Haviryaga =

Hindu ritual

The Haviryaga (ISO: Haviryāga) or Haviryagna (Sanskrit: हविर्यज्ञ, romanized: Haviryajña) is a Hindu ritual. It is a type of Yajna associated with the Vedic sacrifices of uncooked offering, and regarded to achieve various spiritual and material benefits.

The term "Haviryaga" means "a sacrifice in which havis, i.e. uncooked food is used" . Unlike other types of sacrifices, such as Somayajna, which involve the offering of soma juice, a Haviryaga utilizes food materials such as rice, barley, ghee, and milk. The main purpose of such sacrifices is to invoke blessings and ensure material prosperity and happiness in life.

== Types ==
The seven types of Haviryaga are:

- Agnyadhana
- Agnihotra-Homa
- Darsa-purnamasa Istis
- Agrayanesti
- Caturmasya
- Nirudha Pasubandha
- Sautramani

=== Agnyadhana ===
A Vedic sacrifice requires three sacred fires namely Ahavaniya, Garhapatya and Daksinagni. The purpose of Adhana is to entertain these three sacred fires.

It has regular precribed procedure for its function. The fire is constantly maintained in Garhapatya to later utilize it to distribute fire to the rest two fire places for sacrifice as per he rules mentioned in the Srauta Sutras.

Almost the entirety of Homas is performed in the Ahavaniya fire. The sacrificial fire is later called Ahitagni from the day of Adhana. If the fire of Garhapatya gets extinguished, the process of Punaradhana is carried out, and the Ahitagni has to go through the process of Adhana once again.

=== Agnihotra-Homa ===
It is an everyday sacrifice that is performed both at the twilight by Ahitagni along with his wife. The Havis is offered to the Agni along with prayers. The offering can have either rice or milk along with Ajya (Ghee). This yajna is termed as a lifelong Sattra, i.e. it is never to be closed on any account. It can be broken only due to old age or demise.

=== Darsa-purnamasa Istis ===
It is performed once in every two weeks, when it is either the full moon or the new moon day.

=== Agrayanesti ===
It is performed twice every year, when its the time for the arrival of fresh grain in the fields. In includes the Prayanesti, which is performed during Somayajna. It signifies the onset of Somayagna.

=== Chaturmasya ===
It is performed once in every four months over the year. The day falls on the full moon day and this includes certain sacrifices. Therefore, it is termed as Chaturmasya i.e. happening every four months.

=== Nirudha Pasubandha ===
The person who performs sacrifice is assisted by six priests while offering Pasu. In contemporary days, produce of Pasus offered instead of Pasus directly, in the form of dairy products like ghee or milk.

=== Sautramani ===
It is the seventh Haviryaga. It can be performed in two ways for different outcomes. Kaukila Sautramani is performed for the happiness in the present world, while Caraka Sautramani is performed to get the Svarga.

== See also ==
- Vedas
- Yajna
