= Jayanta Bhatta =

9th-century Indian logician and author

Personal life
- Born: c. 820 CE
- Died: c. 900 CE
- Home town: Srinagar

Religious life
- Religion: Hinduism
- Philosophy: Nyaya school of Hindu philosophy

Jayanta Bhatta (c. 820 CE – c. 900 CE) was a poet, teacher, logician, and an advisor to King Sankaravarman of Kashmir. He was a philosopher of the Nyaya school of Hindu philosophy. He authored three works on Nyāya philosophy: one of which is not known, an allegorical drama, and a commentary on Pāṇinian grammar, He refutes the arguments given by Buddhist philosophers like Dharmakirti and Dignāga against the Vedas and establishes the authority of the Vedas.

== Early life ==
Jayanta was born into a wealthy Gaur Brahmin family. He was a child prodigy, composing a commentary to Panini's Ashtadhyayi and earned the name Nava-Vrittikara, or new commentator. Later in life, he mastered various shastra and agama, distinguished himself in scholarly debates, and passed his knowledge on to his students.

Jayanta's birth year, lifespan, dates of his written works are a subject of scholarly debates. His philosophical work Nyāyamañjarī as well as his drama Āgamaḍambara, refer to King Sankaravarman (883 – 902 CE) as a contemporary.

Kādambarikathāsāra, a work written by Jayanta's son Abhinanda, mentions that Jayanta's great grandfather was a minister of king Lalitaditya Muktapida, who was a ruler of the Karkota dynasty in the second quarter of the 8th century CE. Several attempts to specify his life span are based on references to his work by other authors and references to contemporary events and individuals in his work. They range from the middle of the 8th century CE to the start of the 10th century CE. However, most reliable estimates place him around the 9th century CE.

=== Lineage ===
Kādambarikathāsāra provides some information about Jayanta's lineage. It says his ancestor Shakti was a Gaur Brahmin and a direct patriline descendant of Bharadwaja gotra from the Bengal, who lived in Darvabhisara, near the border of Kashmir. His son was named Mitra, and his grandson was Saktisvämin (Shaktisvamin).

Saktisvämin, the great grandfather of Jayanta, was a minister of Kashmir Lalitaditya Muktapida of the Karkota dynasty (c. 724 – 761 CE). Jayanta mentions in Nyayamanjari that his grandfather obtained a village named Gauramulaka, believed to have been located north of the modern town of Rajouri, from King Muktapida. Saktisvämin had a son named Chandra, Jayanta's father.

== Career ==
The Agamadambara provides details about Bhatta's political career. He was an adviser to Kashmiri king Sankaravarman. In his position, he played a role in banishing the Nilambara (Black-Blankets) sect from Kashmir. Commenting on Tantric literature, he argued that the Nilambara sect promoted "immoral teachings". Jayanta claimed the Nilambara "wear simply one blue garment, and then as a group engages in unconstrained public sex". He argued that this practice was "unnecessary" and threatened the fundamental values of society.

== Works ==
=== Philosophical works ===
Jayanta wrote three known treatises on Nyaya philosophy, of which two survive. His first, the Nyayamanjari (A Cluster of Flowers of the Nyaya tree) is a commentary on Nyaya-aphorisms that serves as a critique of the theories of rival philosophical systems like the Mīmānsādarśana.

His second, the Nyayakalika (A Bud of the Nyaya tree) is an overview of the basic tenets of the Nyāya Sūtras, a foundational text of the Nyaya school. His third work, Pallava (probably Nyayapallava, A Twig of the Nyaya tree) though quoted in Syadvadaratnakara, has not survived.

Jayanta mentions in Nyayamanjari that he wrote this treatise during his confinement in a cave by the king. This treatise is unique because it is an independent work, not a commentary of an earlier work.

Secondly, according to Jayanta, the purpose of Nyaya is to protect the authority of the Vedas, Hinduism's oldest scriptures, whereas earlier Nyaya scholars considered Nyaya to be an Anvikshiki (scientific study) providing true knowledge about the real nature of the objects of cognition.

==== Nyayamanjari ====
Jayanta, in his Nyayamanjari, identifies ignorance (moha), attachment (raga), and antipathy (dvesha) as three distinct defects (dosas) that drive human actions:

- moha: further includes dosas such as pramada (carelessness), mada (sense of false superiority)
- raga: further includes dosas such as kama, trsna (desire)
- dvesha: further includes dosas such as droha (harming others), irsya (jealousy)

Jayanta considers moha as the worst defect arguing that it gives rise to raga and dvesha. He further argues that all defects stem from false knowledge and are resolved by right knowledge, however, each defect is psychologically distinct.

=== Literary works ===
His major literary work is Āgamaḍambara, a Sanskrit play in four acts. The hero of his quasi-philosophical drama is a young graduate of the Mimansa school, who wants to defeat all opponents of Vedas through reasoning.

== Philosophy ==
=== God ===
The discussion of God's Existence is found in part 1 of Nyaya Manjuri. Jayanta adheres to a realist viewpoint of God and the world and defends the possibility of reasoned arguments favoring God as a realistic and adequate cause of the world.

=== Criticism of Lokayats ===
Jayanta Bhatta criticized the Lokayata school of philosophy for not developing a Lokayata culture. He said, "The Lokayata is not an Agama. viz. not a guide to cultural living, not a system of do's and dont's; hence it is nothing but irresponsible wrangling."

== English translations ==
The Clay Sanskrit Library published a translation of Āgamaḍambara by Csaba Dezső under the title of Much Ado about Religion.

== See also ==
- Nyaya
