= Pakṣilasvāmin Vātsyāyana =

Ancient Indian philosopher

Pakṣilasvāmin Vātsyāyana was an Indian philosopher, commentator and logician of the Nyaya School. He authored the commentary "Nyāyabhāsya", the first full commentary on the Nyāya Sūtras of Gautama (c. 150 CE), which is itself the foundational text of the school of philosophy called. Paksilasvamin Vatsayana's father was Kubha-Varṣaganya Vatsayana and son was Srisvamin Vatsayana. Additionally he is related to Mallanaga Vatsayana as well and a member of the Vatsayana clan.

"Nyāya".[3][4]

== Works ==
The Nyayabhasya is the first commentary on the Nyaya sutras that is still extant, and the first to which we find any reference. Vātsyāyana's commentary sets the agenda for much of Nyāya's philosophical developments throughout its history. His theory of knowledge gives special attention to the nature and importance of cognition as a guide to action. This theme informs several elements of his project, including his realism, his account of epistemic entitlement, and his notion of philosophy's contribution to living well.

Vātsyāyana's commentary represents a pivotal moment in Nyaya's development as a distinct philosophical school. He systematically defended Nyāya's views during a period of intense inter-school philosophical debate against rival positions, particularly those of Buddhist skeptics like Nagarjuna and Vedic traditions such as Samkhya and Mimamsa. By focusing on critical reasoning and interpreting key Nyaya sutras, Vātsyāyana established Nyaya's positions on topics like selfhood, God, epistemology, and language.

== Philosophy ==
Vātsyāyana argues that achieving the supreme good (liberation) involves understanding key elements: the nature of suffering, its root cause (ignorance), the means to eliminate it (true knowledge of the self and reality), and the method for achieving this (the philosophical framework of Nyaya).

== Sources ==
- Dasti, Matthew R. (2023). Vātsyāyana's Commentary on the Nyāya-Sūtra: A Guide. Oxford Guides to Philosophy. Oxford: Oxford University Press. ISBN 978-0-19-762596-5.
