= Tarka-Sangraha =

Nyāya text

Tarka-Sangraha (IAST: Tarka-saṅgraha) is a treatise in Sanskrit giving a foundational exposition of the Indian system of logic and reasoning. The work is authored by Annambhatta and the author himself has given a detailed commentary, called Tarka-Sangraha Deepika, for the text. Annambhatta composed the text as well as the commentary in the second half of 17th century CE. The text of Tarka-sangraha is a small book with about 15 pages only and it was composed to help boys and girls learn easily the basic principles of Nyaya. Of all the works of Annambhatta, only Tarka-Sangraha and its commentary attained wide acceptance. They have been used as basic text for beginners for several generations.

In Indian philosophical writings, the traditional structure of presenting a system consisted of three things: uddesa (listing of items to be discussed), laksana (defining each item in the list) and pariksa (critically examining whether the definitions apply properly to the items defined). The Tarka-Sangraha follows this model except for the third item of pariksa. The text presents the ontology, logic and epistemology of the Nyaya-Vaiseshika system.

== Title ==
Tarka-Sangraha is a compound of the words "tarka" and "saṃgraha." Saṃgraha means collection or compilation. Tarka has various meanings, but Annambhatta defines it in his commentary, Tarka-Samgraha-Dipika, as all the categories accepted in Vaiśeṣika philosophy.

== Content ==
Annambhatta begins the Tarka-Sangraha with a verse in prayer to Shiva and salutations to his guru.

== Annambhatta, author of Tarka-Sangraha ==
Practically only very little is known about Annambhatta the author of Tarka-Sangraha. From the scanty references to other works and writers contained in his works, it has been estimated that Annambhatta must be a comparatively modern author and he must have flourished during the seventeenth century CE. His father was Tirumala Ācārya from Advaitavidyācārya Rāghava Somyāji's family. Tirumala was Tailanga Brahmin of North Arcot District of erstwhile state of Andhra Pradesh who had settled down in Benares. He was a Rigvedi Smarta Brahmana well versed in Vedanta philosophy.

Annambhatta's native village was Garikapāda. Annambhatta was a learned man in several areas of traditional scholarship, namely, Nyaya, Vyakarana, Vedanta and Purva-Mimamsa. He studied grammar with Śeṣa Vīreśvara while in Varanasi. He learned about Advaita Vedanta from Brahmendra Sārasvatī and Mimamsa from Viśvanātha.

Though not as well known as Tarka-Sangraha, many of Annambhatta's works on other disciplines have survived. Besides, Tarka-Sangraha and its Commentary Dipika, the following works have been attributed to Annambhatta:

- Mitakshara (on the Brahma Sūtras)
- Tattva-Bodhini-Tika
- Nyaya-Parisishta-Prakasa
- Subodhini-Sudhasara
- Katyayana-Pratisakhya-Vyakhyana
- Mahabhashya-Vivarnodyatana
- Tattvacinthamnyaloka-Siddhanjana
- Brahmasutra-Vritti

Annambhata only mentions his name in the colophon of the Tarka-Sangraha.

| Sanskrit | English |
|---|---|
| kaṇādanyāyamatayorvālavyutpatti siddhaye | annaṃbhaṭṭena viduṣā racitastarkasaṃgrahaḥ ||The learned scholar, Annambhaṭṭa, has composed this text called Tarkasangraha in order to facilitate the understanding of the learners about the doctrines of Kaṇāda i.e. Vaiśeṣika and Nyāya. | |

== Commentaries on Tarka-Sangraha ==
Because of its wide popularity, several scholars have written commentaries on Tarks-Sangraha. Annambhatta, the author of the treatise, himself has written a commentary named Tarka-Samgraha-Dipika. Researchers have located as many as 90 different commentaries on Tarka-Sangraha including the one by Annambhatta.

== Notes ==
- For a detailed discussion on the date of Annambhatta, author of Tarka-Sangraha, see Tarka Sangraha of Annambhatta (Bombay Sanskrit Series).
- The text of Tarka-Sangraha without any commentary has been reproduced in the Devanagari script itself in the website of Sanskrit Documents.org.
