= Nyāya Sūtras =

Sanskrit text of the Nyaya school of Hindu philosophy

The means to correct knowledge, according to ancient Nyayasutras

The Nyāya Sūtras (Sanskrit: न्यायसूत्र) is an ancient Indian Sanskrit text composed by Akṣapāda Gautama and the foundational text of the Nyaya school of Hindu philosophy. The date when the text was composed is unknown, but variously estimated between 6th century BCE and 2nd century CE. The biography of its author is unknown, and the text may have been composed by more than one author over a period of time. The text consists of five books, with two chapters in each book, with a cumulative total of 528 aphoristic sutras about rules of reason, logic, epistemology and metaphysics.

The Nyāya Sūtras is a Hindu text, (Note: Francis Clooney states, "Nyaya is the traditional school of Hindu logic. In the early centuries BCE the Nyaya logicians undertook the project of describing the world in a coherent rational fashion and without reliance on revelation or a commitment to any particular deity. Nyaya's primary text, the Nyaya Sutras of Gautama, can be read as a neutral analysis neither favoring nor opposing the idea of God".) notable for focusing on knowledge and logic, and making no mention of Vedic rituals. The first book is structured as a general introduction and table of contents of sixteen categories of knowledge. Book two is about pramana (epistemology), book three is about prameya (the objects of knowledge), and the remaining books discuss the nature of knowledge. It set the foundation for the Nyaya tradition of the empirical theory of validity and truth, opposing uncritical appeals to intuition or scriptural authority.

The Nyāya Sūtras cover a wide range of topics, including Tarka-Vidyā, the science of debate, or Vāda-Vidyā, the science of discussion. The Nyāya Sutras are related to but extend the Vaiśeṣika epistemological and metaphysical system. Later commentaries expanded, expounded, and discussed the Nyaya sutras. The earliest surviving commentaries are the Nyāyabhāṣya of Pakṣilasvāmin Vātsyāyana (5th–6th century CE), the Nyāyavārttika of Uddyotakāra (6th–7th century CE), Vācaspati Miśra's Tātparyatīkā (9th century CE), Udayana's Tātparyapariśuddhi (10th century CE), and Jayanta's Nyāyamañjarī (10th century CE).

== Author and chronology ==
The Nyaya-sutras is attributed to Gautama, who was at least the principal author. According to Karl Potter, this name has been a very common Indian name, and the author is also reverentially referred to as Gotama, Dirghatapas and Aksapada Gautama. Little is known about Gautama, or which century he lived in. Scholarly estimates, based on textual analysis, vary from the 6th century BCE, making him a contemporary of Gautama Buddha (Siddhartha Gautama) and Mahavira, to as late as the 2nd century CE. Some scholars favor the theory that the cryptic text Nyaya-sutras was expanded over time by multiple authors, with the earliest layer from about mid-first millennium BCE that was composed by Gautama. The earliest layer is likely to be Books 1 and 5 of the text, while Books 3 and 4 may have been added last, but this is not certain.

One may sum up the situation pretty safely by saying that we have not the vaguest idea who wrote the Nyayasutras or when he lived.

— Karl Potter, The Encyclopedia of Indian Philosophies

It is likely, states Jeaneane Fowler, that Nyaya and the science of reason stretch back into the Vedic era; they developed in the ancient Indian tradition that involved "dialectical tournaments, in the halls of kings and schools of Vedic philosophers", and Gautama was the one who distilled and systematized this pre-existing knowledge into sutras, or aphoristic compilations called nyayasutras.

The Nyaya school of Hinduism influenced all other schools of Hindu philosophy, as well as Buddhism. Despite their differences, these scholars studied with each other and debated ideas, with Tibetan records suggesting that Buddhist scholars spent years residing with Hindu Nyaya scholars to master the art of reasoning and logic. This cooperation has enabled scholars to place the currently surviving version of the Nyayasutras, to a terminus ante quem (completed before) date of about the 2nd century CE, because one of the most famous and established Buddhist scholars of that era, Nagarjuna, explicitly states, "sutra 4.2.25 is addressed against the Madhyamika system" of Buddhism. Other ancient Buddhist texts confirm that the Nyayasutras existed before them, and the text is considered the primary text of the old Nyaya school of Hinduism.

== Structure ==
Reality is truth (prāma),
and what is true is so,
irrespective of whether we know it is,
or are aware of that truth.

— Akṣapada Gautama in Nyaya Sutra

The text is written in sutra genre. A sutra is a Sanskrit word that means "string, thread", and represents a condensed manual of knowledge of a specific field or school. Each sutra is any short rule, like a theorem distilled into few words or syllables, around which "teachings of ritual, philosophy, grammar or any field of knowledge" can be woven. Sutras were compiled to be remembered, used as reference and to help teach and transmit ideas from one generation to the next.

The Nyayasutra is divided into five books, each book subdivided into two chapters each. The structure of the text is, states Potter, a layout of ahnikas or lessons served into daily portions, each portion consisting of a number of sutras or aphorisms. The architecture of the text is also split and collated into prakaranas or topics, which later commentators such as Vatsyayana and Vacaspati Misra used to compose their bhasya, ancient texts that have survived into the modern era. There are several surviving manuscripts of the Nyayasutras, with a slight difference in number of sutras, of which the Chowkhamba edition is often studied.

The structure of Nyayasutra
Book	Chapter	Number of sutras	Topics
1	1	41	Subject matter and statement of purpose of the text. Four reliable instruments of correct knowledge. Definitions. Nature of argument and nature of the process of valid proof.
1	2	20	How to analyze opposing views, presents its theory of five-membered arguments, correct conclusions are those where contradictions do not exist, theory of reasoning methods that are flawed, what is a quibble and how to avoid it.
2	1	69	Presents its theory of Doubt. Discusses epistemology, when perception, inference and comparison is unreliable and reliable. Theory that the reliability of testimony depends on the reliability of the source. Theory that the testimony in the Vedas are a source of knowledge and inconsistencies are either defects or choices in the text, the best way to understand the Vedas is to divide it into three: injunction, descriptions and reinculcations.
2	2	71	Instruments of knowledge are fourfold, Confusion caused by presumption and prejudice, Sound is noneternal theory, Theory of three meaning of words (vyakti, akrti and jati)
3	1	73	presents its theory of body, followed by theory of sensory organs and their role in correct and incorrect knowledge, states that the soul is not a sense organ nor an internal organ.
3	2	72	presents its theory of soul (self, atman), that the essence of a person and source of judgments is the soul, states its "judgment is non-eternal" theory, presents theory of Karma
4	1	68	Presents its theory of defects, then its theory that "everything has cause, and consequences", and its "some things are eternal, some non-eternal" theory. Defines and describes Fruits, Pain, Release.
4	2	50	Presents correct knowledge is necessary and sufficient to destroy defects. Both whole and part must be known. Establishes external world exists, and phenomenon are as real as objects. Refutes the "everything is false" theory. Presents ways to produce and maintain correct knowledge, Need to seek and converse with those with knowledge.
5	1	43	24 futile rejoinders, how to avoid errors and present relevant rejoinders
5	2	24	22 ways of losing an argument

== Content ==
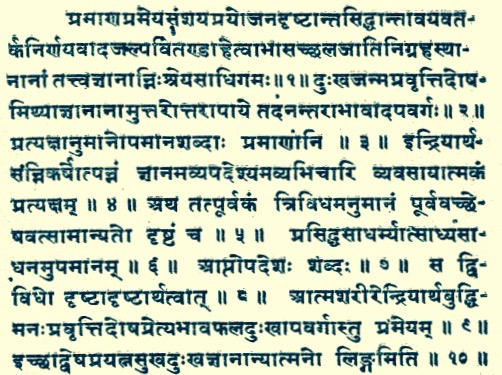
The first ten sutras of the text in Sanskrit

The first sutra 1.1.1 of the text asserts its scope and the following sixteen categories of knowledge as a means to gain competence in any field of interest:

Perfection is attained by the correct knowledge about true nature of sixteen categories: means of right knowledge (pramāṇa); object of right knowledge (prameya); doubt (samsaya); purpose (prayojana); familiar instance (dṛṣṭānta); established tenet (siddhānta); members of an inference (avayava); reasoning (tarka); ascertainment or results (nirṇaya); discussion (vāda); sophistic disputations (jalpa); cavil (vitaṇḍa); fallacies (hetvābhāsa); quibbles (chala); futile rejoinders (jāti); and methods of losing an argument (nigrahasthāna).

— Nyayasutra, 1.1.1

These sixteen categories cover many sections of the text. The verse 1.1.2 of the Nyāya Sūtra declares the text's goal is to study and describe the attainment of liberation of soul from wrong knowledge, faults and sorrow, through the application of above sixteen categories of perfecting knowledge.

=== Means of attaining valid knowledge ===
The Nyaya-sutras assert the premise that "all knowledge is not intrinsically valid", that "most knowledge is not valid unless proven" and "truth exists whether we human beings know it or not". However, states Fowler, the text accepts the foundation that "some knowledge is self evident" and axiomatic in every field of knowledge, which can neither be proven nor needs proof, such as "I am conscious", "I think" and "soul exists". Furthermore, the text presents its thesis that knowledge is not self-revealing, one must make effort to gain knowledge and this is a systematic process that empowers one to learn correct knowledge, and abandon incorrect knowledge.

The Nyāya sutras asserts and then discusses four reliable means of obtaining knowledge (pramāṇa), viz., Perception, Inference, Comparison and Reliable Testimony.

==== Pratyaksha: Perception ====
The Nyayasutras assert that perception is the primary proper means of gaining true knowledge. All other epistemic methods are directly or indirectly based on perception, according to the text, and anything that is claimed to be "true knowledge" must be confirmed or confirmable by perception. This it terms as the doctrine of convergence, and this doctrine includes direct or implied perception. Gautama defines perception as the knowledge that arises by the contact of one or more senses with an object or phenomenon. Gautama dedicates many sutras to discuss both the object and subject in the process of perception, and when senses may be unreliable. Erratic eyesight or other senses (Avyabhicara) can be a source of doubt or false knowledge, as can prejudgmental or prejudicial state of mind, states the Nyayasutras.

The text asserts Pratyaksa leads to Laukika or ordinary knowledge, where the five senses directly and clearly apprehend a reality, and this is true definite knowledge according to the text. It defines indefinite knowledge as one where there is doubt, and the text gives an example of seeing a distant stationary object in the evening and wondering whether it is a post or a man standing in the distance. In some of these cases, states Nyayasutras, correct knowledge is formulated by the principle of cumulative evidence. Manas (mind) is considered an internal sense, in the text, and it can either lead to correct or incorrect knowledge depending on how it includes, excludes or integrates information. These ideas are compiled, in later chapters of the text, into its treatise on Aprama (Theory on Errors).

==== Anumana: Inference ====
Inference is knowledge which is preceded by perception,
and is of three kinds:
a priori, a posteriori and commonly seen.

— Nyayasutras 1.1.5

The epistemic rationale for inference as a reliable source of knowledge, and Nyaya's theory has been a major contribution to the diverse schools of Indian Darshanaparampara, and other schools looked up to Nyaya scholars for insights on correct knowledge and incorrect knowledge through inference. The sections in Nyayasutras on inference blossomed into a treatise on syllogism over time.

Nyayasutras defines inference as the knowledge that follows or derives from other knowledge. It always follows perception, states the text, and is a universal relation or essential principle. One form of inference is a Purvavat, or as Fowler translates, "from cause to effect or a priori". Thus, if a path or road is wet or river is swollen, states the text, then "it has rained" is a valid knowledge. The sutras assert that the "universal relationship" between the two is necessary for correct, reliable knowledge, that is "if in all cases of A, B is true, then one may correctly infer B whenever A is perceived". Further, there is a causal relation between the two, whether one knows or not of that cause, but inferred knowledge does not require one to know the cause for it to be valid knowledge, states Nyayasutra. The text states one must not confuse coexistence as a universal relation, and that while deduction and induction both are useful and valid means for gaining true knowledge, it lists rules when this method can lead to false knowledge.

==== Upamana: Comparison and analogy ====
The word upamana, states Fowler, is a compound of upa (similarity) and mana (knowledge). It is a means of gaining knowledge based on "similarity, comparison, analogy", and considered reliable in Nyaya and many schools of Indian Darshanaparampara (but not in Vaisheshika and Charvaka, or Buddhism).

The Nyayasutras define upamana as the knowledge of a thing based on "its likeness to another thing which is familiar". It differs from Anumana (inference) in lacking a direct or immediate causal relation. It differs from Pratyaksha (perception), states the text, in using a linguistic referent and the foundation of pre-existing knowledge within the individual and what he learnt from his teachers, friends, family and past knowledge inherited from the wise, through a process of social cooperation. The Upamana method is secondary, it relies on perception, combined with linguistic referent and context. Comparison is not isolated pramana means, and sometimes works together with the Anumana and Sabda epistemic methods. Comparison is, in Nyayasutras, the process of permeating or infusing hypothesis, examples and tests, thus leading to objectivity and correct knowledge about something new and what one already presumes to know.

==== Shabda: Testimony and reliable sources ====
Śabda (Sanskrit: शब्द, Word), in Nyayasutras, means relying on word, testimony of a reliable source. Sabda-pramana has been an accepted and reliable method to knowledge by all orthodox schools of Hinduism including Nyaya, asserting that a human being needs to know numerous facts, and with the limited time and energy available, he can learn only a fraction of those facts and truths directly. He must rely on others, his parents, family, friends, teachers, ancestors and kindred members of society to rapidly acquire and share knowledge and thereby enrich each other's lives. This means of gaining correct knowledge is either spoken or written, but it is through Sabda (words). In addition to words, state the Nyayasutras, Shabda as a means of true knowledge depends on an agreed convention on what words mean, the structure of sentences, establishing context and their import. The source must be reliable and comprehensible, and the receiver of knowledge must be able to understand the knowledge therefrom.

The reliability of the source is important, and legitimate knowledge can only come from the Sabda of reliable sources. The schools of Indian Darshanaparampara have debated if, how and when reliability of source can be objectively established. Gautama, in the Nyayasutras, offers a description for a reliable source. Some schools, such as Charvaka, state that this is never possible, and therefore Sabda in the Vedas or anyone else, can never be a proper pramana. Other schools debate means to establish reliability.

=== Theory of proper argument ===
The text, in sutras 1.1.32 and 1.1.39, presents its theory of proper arguments, stating that a proper argument must include five components:

1. pratijna – the proposition or hypothesis (that which needs to be proved or decided)
2. hetu – the reason (can be positive or negative)
3. udaharana – the general rule (that which is independently confirmed or confirmable)
4. upanaya – the application of the rule (validity test, or example to the instance)
5. nigamana – the conclusion (the hypothesis is either true or false or in doubt)

The text defines and aphoristically discusses each of these.

An example of a proper argument is:

1. There is a fire on the hill
2. Because there is smoke on the hill
3. Whenever there is smoke, there is a fire
4. The hill is smoky
5. Therefore, there is a fire on the hill

=== Theory of doubt as incomplete knowledge ===
The Nyayasutras define and discuss Samsaya (Sanskrit: संशय, doubt) in sutras 1.1.23, 2.1.1 to 2.1.7, 3.2.1, 4.2.4 among others. This discussion is similar to those found in other schools of Hindu philosophy, expands on the theory of doubt presented by Kanada in the Vaisheshika school, but disagrees with the Charvaka school's theory of doubt and consequent "there is no empirical knowledge ever".

The theory of doubt, according to the Nyayasutras, starts with the premise that doubt is part of the human learning process and occurs when conflicting possibilities exist with regard to a cognized object. Doubt is neither error nor absence of knowledge, but a form of uncertainty and human struggle with probability when it faces incomplete or inconsistent information. It is a knowledge that is possibly partially valid and partially invalid, but doubt is a form of knowledge that has positive value. Doubt is an invitation to "proceed to further investigation", asserts the text. All four means of knowledge discovery (perception, inference, comparison and testimony) may be useful in this investigation, but doubt is both a psychological state and a means to knowledge, not in itself a valid knowledge, according to the sutras.

=== Hetvabhasa, theory of errors ===
The Nyayasutra defines error as knowledge, an opinion or a conclusion about something that is different from what it really is. Gautama states in the text that the error is always in the process of cognition itself, or the "subjective self", and not in the object. It is the duty of the knowledge-seeker to "test the validity of his knowledge", both in assumptions or through practice (experience), but neither the object of knowledge nor the knowledge itself is responsible for errors; only the knowledge-seeker and his process of cognition is. The Nyaya theory shares ideas on the theory of errors with Advaita Vedanta, Buddhism and Mimamsa schools of Indian philosophies, states Rao, and these schools likely influenced each other.

The text identifies and cautions against five kinds of fallacious reasoning (hetvabhasa) in sutra 1.2.4, discussing each in the sutras that follow, stating that these lead to false knowledge, in contrast to proper reasoning (hetu), which leads to true knowledge. The five fallacies or errors, according to Nyayasutras, are to be avoided, in addition to watching for debating tricks (chala) used by those whose aim is not true knowledge. The five forms of bogus reasoning identified by the text, states Ganeri, are:

1. the wandering or erratic (Nyayasutra 1.2.5)
2. the contradictory (Nyayasutra 1.2.6)
3. the unproven (Nyayasutra 1.2.8)
4. the counterbalanced (Nyayasutra 1.2.7)
5. the untimely (overgeneralization across time, or sublated, Nyayasutra 1.2.9)

=== Theory of causality ===
The Nyayasutras dedicate many sections on causality and causal relations (Karana, Sanskrit: कारण), particularly Book 4. Causes, in Nyaya view states Fowler, are "antecedents of their effects invariably and unconditionally". A specific effect is produced by a specific cause (plurality in causes is accepted). A specific cause produces a specific effect and no other (plurality in effect, or contradictory effect is not accepted). There cannot be reciprocity to a cause; either we misunderstand the cause or misapprehend the effect. The text rejects remote or supernatural causes, and rejects that qualities are causes. Causes are immediately antecedent, causes exist before an effect in time, and to know something is to understand the effect and the specific cause(s).

The text identifies three types of causes – inherent or material cause (Samavayi-karana), non-inherent cause (Asamavayi-karana), and efficient cause (Nimitta-karana). These, it states, arise from Dravya (substance), Guna (quality) and Karma (action).

=== Theory of negatives ===
The text seeds the theory of negative entities, where both being and non-being, presence and absence of something is considered correct and useful knowledge. Absence of a book on a table or absence of particular color in a painting has a place in its epistemic process, in addition to positively verifiable characteristics of the table or a painting.

=== God in Nyayasutras ===
Early Nyaya school scholars considered the hypothesis of Ishvara as a creator God with the power to grant blessings, boons and fruits.

In Nyayasutra's Book 4, Chapter 1 examines what causes production and destruction of entities (life, matter) in the universe. It considers many hypotheses, including Ishvara. Verses 19–21 postulate that Ishvara exists and is the cause, states a consequence of the postulate, then presents contrary evidence, and from contradiction concludes that the postulate must be invalid.

सिद्धान्तसूत्र : ईश्वरः कारणम्, पुरुषकर्माफल्यदर्शनात्
पूर्वपक्षसूत्र : न, पुरुषकर्माभावे फ्लानिष्पत्तेः
सिद्धान्तसूत्र : तत्कारितत्वादहेतुः

Proposition sutra: Ishvara is the cause, since we see sometimes human action lacks fruits (results).
Prima facie objection sutra: This is not so since, as a matter of fact, no fruit is accomplished without human action.
Conclusion sutra: Not so, since it is influenced by him.

— Nyaya Sutra, 4.1.19 – 4.1.21

Other scholars of Nyaya school reconsidered this question and offered arguments for what is God (Ishvara) and various arguments to prove the existence of Ishvara. The 5th century CE Nyaya school scholar Prastapada, for example, revisited the premise of God. He was followed by Udayana, who in his text Nyayakusumanjali, interpreted "it" in verse 4.1.21 of Nyaya Sutra above, as "human action" and "him" as "Ishvara", then he developed counter arguments to prove the existence of Ishvara, a reasoning that fueled the debate and disagreements on God in Neo-Nyaya and other Hindu traditions of 2nd millennium CE.

=== Soul, self exists, inner freedom ===
The Soul is the perceiver of all that brings pain and pleasure,
the experiencer of all pains and pleasures,
the knower of all pains, pleasures and their causes,
the ground of consciousness, knowledge and cognitions.
The Soul (self) can be known.

— Nyayasutras, interpreted by Jeaneane Fowler, Perspectives of Reality: An Introduction to the Philosophy of Hinduism

A large part of the third book of the Nyayasutras is dedicated to the premise and the nature of a Self (soul, atman) and its relation to knowledge, liberation from sorrow and inner freedom (moksha).

=== Philosophy: a form of Yoga ===
The sutras 4.2.42 to 4.2.48 of Nyayasutras, states Stephen Phillips, state that "philosophy is a form of yoga".

The text recommends yogic meditation in quiet places such as a forest, cave or sandy beach in sutra 4.2.42, that the knowledge seeker should purify one's soul by Yamas, Niyamas and spiritualism of yoga in sutra 4.2.46. Meditation is a treasured and recommended practice in the text, and extensively discussed by Nyaya scholars that followed Aksyapada Gautama. Vatsyayana wrote in his commentary on Nyayasutras, for example, that meditation is that which enables the mind to contact one's soul, which is accompanied by a conscious eagerness to get at the truth, and such meditation is an essential practice to gain true knowledge.

The Nyayasutras state that one must study the means of correct knowledge and hold discussions with the learned, sincere and unenvious fellow seekers of knowledge state sutras 4.2.47 and 4.2.48. One must, translates Phillips, take into account "consideration of personal character as well as the nature of beliefs held by the opponent", in deciding the nature of one's discussions, according to Nyayasutras. In some cases, asserts the text, it is better to avoid arguing with hostile opponents and use methods of knowledge like "a fence is used to safeguard the growth of seeds".

== Commentaries ==
The earliest surviving complete bhasya (review and commentary) on Nyaya Sutras is by Vatsyayana. This commentary itself inspired many secondary and tertiary bhasya. Vatsyayana's commentary has been variously dated to be from the 5th century CE, or much earlier around 2nd century BCE. Another often studied surviving commentary on the text is credited to Vacaspati Mishra from about 9th century CE.

Liberation is impossible without knowledge of the real nature of the world. To achieve liberation and to know the soul, one must take shelter of yoga practices, because without this knowledge, knowledge of Reality is not obtained.

— Akṣapada Gautama in Nyayasutra

Other historical Indian commentaries and works inspired by Nyayasutras and which have survived into the modern era, include Nyaya-varttika by 6th-century Uddyotakara, Nyaya-bhasyatika by 6th-century Bhavivikta, another Nyaya-bhasyatika by 7th-century Aviddhakarna, Nyaya-bhusana by 9th-century Bhasarvajana, Nyaya-manjari by 9th-century Kashmir scholar Jayanta Bhatta, Nyaya-prakirnaka by 10th-century Karnata scholar Trilocana, and Nyaya-kandali by 10th-century Bengal scholar Sridhara.

Numerous other commentaries are referenced in other Indian historical texts, but these manuscripts are either lost or yet to be found. Starting around 11th- to 12th century CE, Udayana wrote a primary work, that built upon and expanded the theories on reason found in Nyayasutras. Udayana's work created the foundation for Navya-Nyaya (new Nyaya) school. The Hindu scholar Gangesa of 13th- or 14th-century, integrated the Gautama's Nyayasutras and Udayana's Navya-Nyaya work, to create the influential Tattvacintāmaṇi text considered a masterpiece by scholars.

== Influence ==
=== On Hinduism's soul, Buddhism's no-soul debate ===
The Nyaya-sutras have been one of the foundations for the historic debate between Hinduism's premise that purusa (spirit, ultimate reality) and atman (selfhood, soul) exists, and Buddhism's premise that there is voidness and anatta (no-soul). In Nyaya-sutra, the Buddhist premises and arguments to refute those premise are found in many chapters, (Note: Nyayasutras' 3.2.10–17 present its argument against Buddhist "momentariness of everything", while sutras 4.1.37–40 challenge the "voidness of everything" premise of Buddhism, sutras 4.2.6–4.2.11 question its "whole is not separate from parts" premise, and sutras 4.2.26–37 present its refutation of Buddhism's "denial of objects and observed reality" premises.) such as sutras of chapters 3.2, 4.1 and 4.2. The text has been influential in this debate, with the 2nd-century Buddhist scholar Nagarjuna states that the Nyaya school and Buddhism differ on their conception of Self (Atman) and their views on the Vedas, and the sutra 4.2.25 of Nyayasutra is addressed against the Madhyamika system of Buddhism. (Note: Like other schools of Hinduism, the Nyaya school holds the premise, "Soul exists, and Soul (or self, Atman) is a self evident truth". Buddhism, in contrast, holds the premise, "Atman does not exist, and An-atman (or Anatta, non-self) is self evident". Buddhists do not believe that at the core of all human beings and living creatures, there is any "eternal, essential and absolute something called a soul, self or atman".)

Nagarjuna's Madhyamika-karika targets Nyaya-sutra, among other Hindu texts, for his critique and to establish his doctrine of no self and voidness. In this text, and Vigrahavya-vartani, he presents his proof of voidness by challenging the Pramanas at the foundation of Nyaya-sutras. In his work Pramana-vihetana, Nagarjuna, takes up each of the sixteen categories of knowledge in Gautama's Nyaya-sutras at the foundation of Nyaya's discussion of "soul exists and the nature of soul in liberation process", and critiques them using the argument that these categories are relational and therefore unreal. The Nagarjuna's texts, along with Gautama's Nyaya-sutras states Sanjit Sadhukhan, influenced Vatsyayana's work who called Nagarjuna's doctrine of voidness as flawed, and presented his arguments refuting Nagarjuna's theory on "objects of knowledge are unreal, like a dream or a form of jugglery and a mirage", but by first presenting his demonstration that the theory of reason and knowledge in the Nyaya-sutras are valid.

The Buddhist thesis that all things are negative in nature (inasmuch as a thing's nature is constituted by its differences from others), or the Hindu thesis counter-arguing the Buddhist thesis, have been accepted, is still unclear because nothingness cannot be proved and existence of soul has been claimed solely on the basis of personal feeling and experience.

=== On Vedanta traditions ===
The Nyayasutras were influential to the Vedanta schools of Hindu philosophy, and provided the epistemological foundations. The terms Nyaya and Mimamsa were synonymous, states Hajime Nakamura, in the earliest Dharmasutras of 1st millennium BCE. Over time, Nyaya, Mimamsa and Vedanta became three distinct and related schools.

== Translations ==
- Nandalal Sinha, Mahamahopadhyaya Satisa Chandra Vidyabhusana, The Nyaya Sutras of Gotama, The sacred books of the Hindus, 1930; Motilal Banarsidass, 1990 reprint, ISBN 978-81-208-0748-8; Munshiram Manoharlal reprint, 2003, ISBN 978-81-215-1096-7.
- Ganganatha Jha, Nyaya- Sutras of Gautama (4 vols.), Motilal Banarsidass, 1999 reprint, ISBN 978-81-208-1264-2.

== See also ==
- Debates in ancient India
- Nyaya
