= Sanskrit and Vedic learning in Mithila =

Study and transmission of Vedic texts and traditions in Mithila

Sanskrit and Vedic learning, also called Vedic studies, started in Mithila with the expansion of Vedic and Brahmanic culture eastwards along the Ganges plain. From the 12th/13th to 15th century CE, Mithila was an important centre of Nyaya Shastra and logical sciences.

Symbolic statue of Gautama Rishi, the founder of Nyaya Shastra.

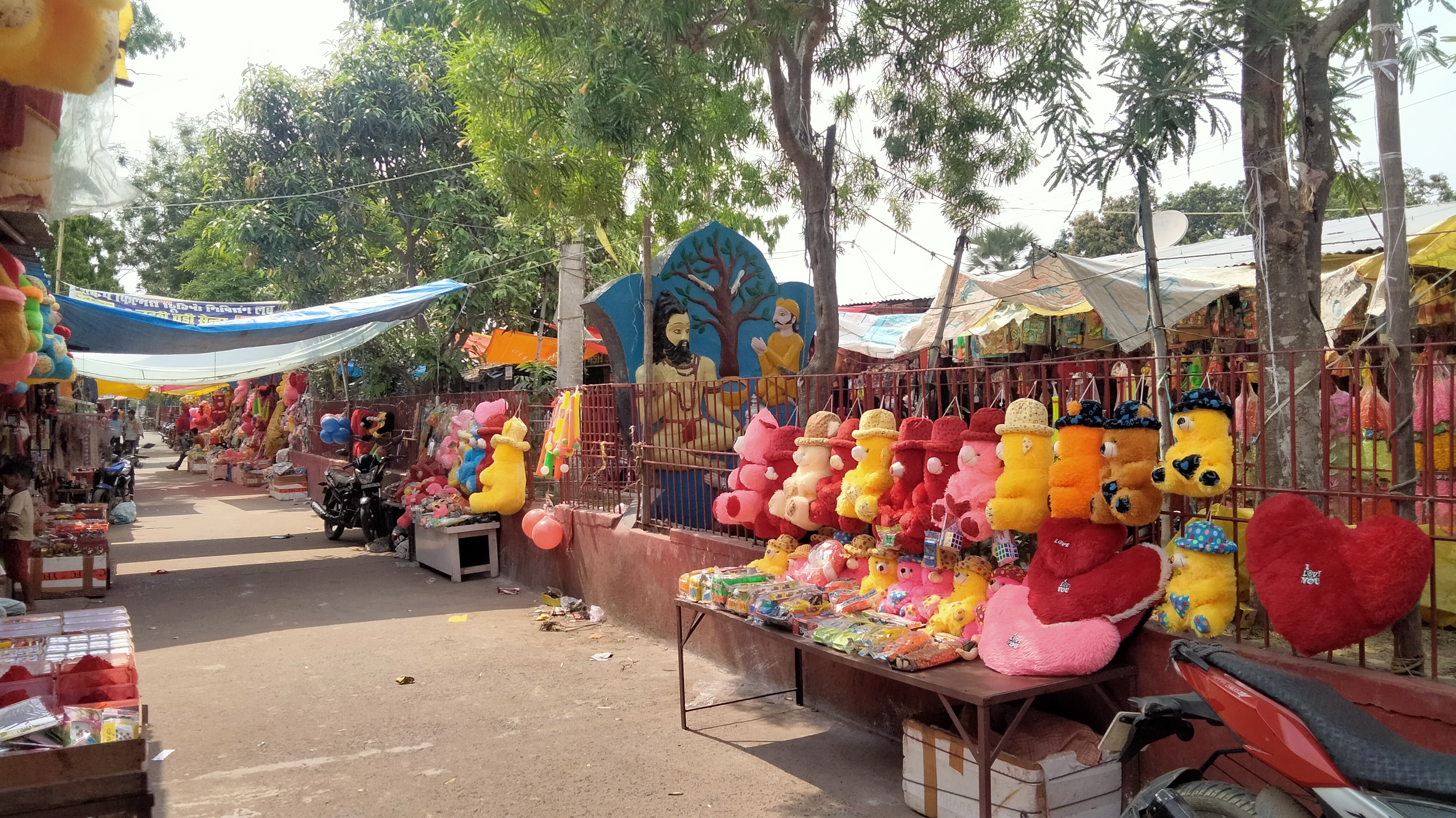
A statue (at the entrance of the Uchchaith Bhagawati Mandir complex near Benipatti town) depicting the Vedic tradition in Mithila.

== Nomenclature ==
Some scholars have used the term "university" to describe the tradition of Sanskrit and Vedic learning in Mithila. (Note: University: * R.K. Mukherjee, Ancient Indian Education (Brahmanical and Buddhist), chapter 24 * Bishwambhar Jha, Education in early Mithila: A reappraisal: "The whole of Mithila converted into a great university" J.L. Mehta, Advanced study in the history of medieval India, has used the phrase "University of Mithila" for denoting the tradition of learning in Mithila. * Mahamahopadhya Satis Chandra Vidyabhusana, A History of Indian Logic, describes the learning tradition of Mithila (12th -16th century CE) as 'The University of Mithila'.) It is regarded as an ancient university like the Nalanda. In the text Brihada Vishnu Purana, the descriptive epithet name of Mithila is also mentioned as Gyanshila or Jnanakshetram which translates to "Home of Knowledge".

In 1907, the Calcutta University Magazine published an essay that claimed the Indian Naiyayika Raghunath Shiromani received the right to confer degrees from Mithila University in 1503, from which date the 'Nadia University is considered to be established'.

== History ==
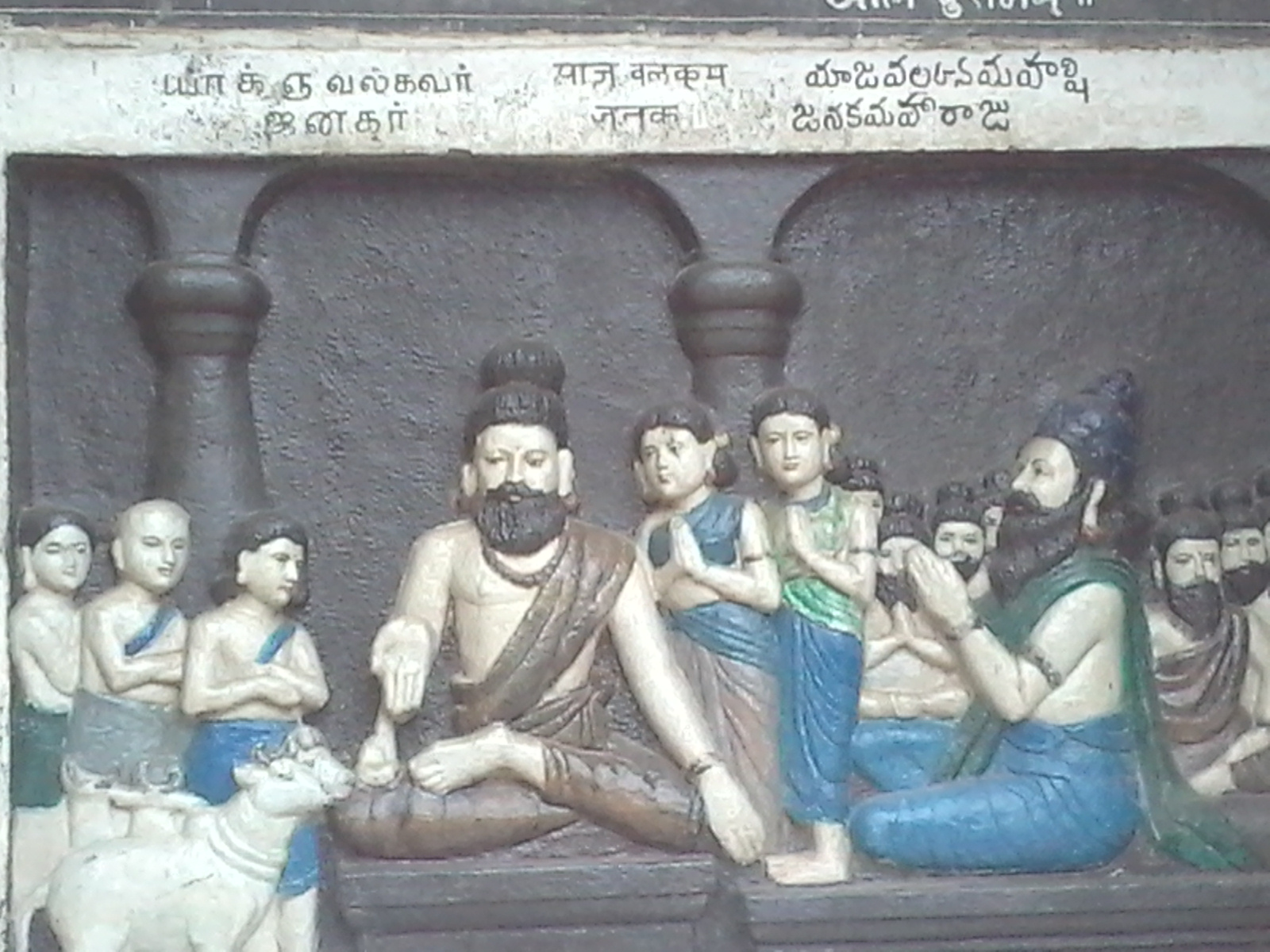
Yajnavalkya teaches Brahma Vidya to King Janaka in his ashram in Mithila

The Ramayana refers to the court of King Janaka in Mithila, attracting scholars and philosophers. In the text Brihadaranyaka Upanishad, there is reference of the famous scholarly Yajna known as Bahudakshina Yajna, in which Brahmin scholars from different parts of the Indian subcontinent participated for Shastrartha at the court of King Janaka.

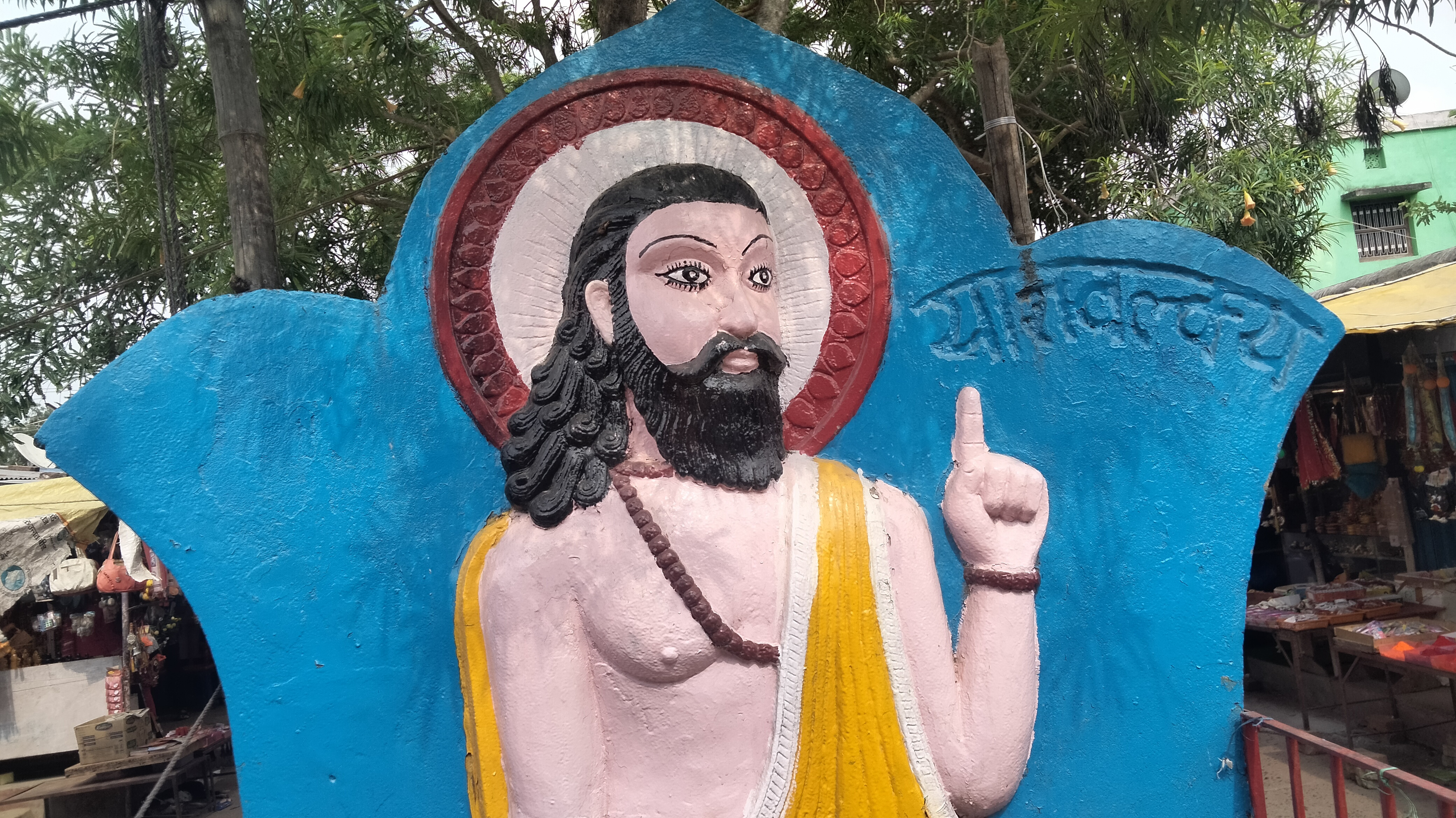
Memorial Statue of Yajnavalkya at the entrance of the Uchchaith Bhagawati Mandir near the Benipatti town in the Madhubani district of the Mithila region of Bihar in India.

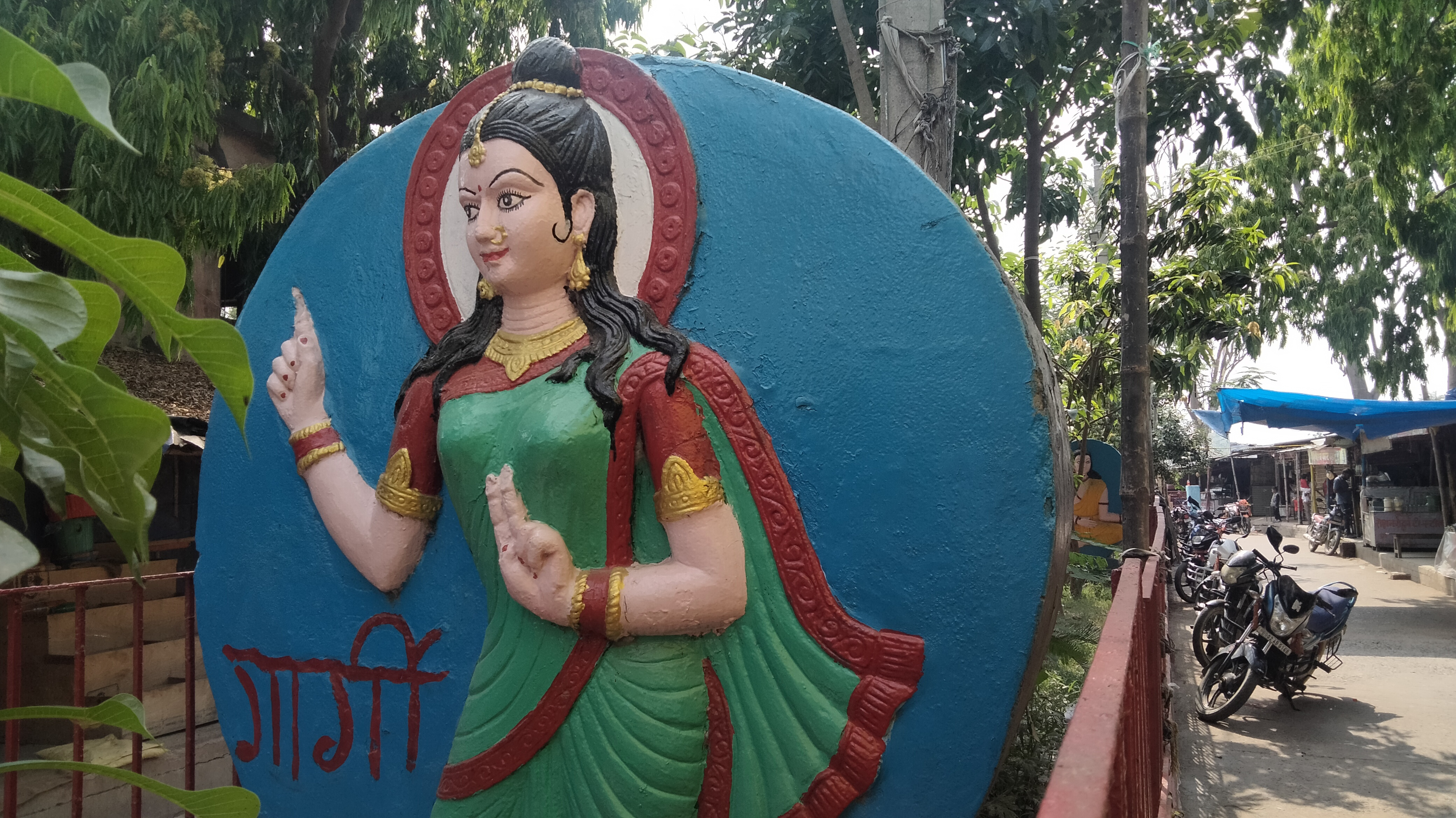
Memorial Statue of Gargi Vachaknavi at the Uchchaith Bhagawati Mandir

In ancient times, some villages in Mithila were designated as the seat of specific branches of Vedas. The seat of learning Rigaveda was at Riga village and similarly that of Yajurveda was Jajuara village. The seat for learning Atharvaveda was at Athari village. Similarly, Sankorth village was the seat of Samaveda. The scholars of each villages were specialised according to the designated branches of Vedas in their villages. In the later period, the Maithil Brahmins divided into two major divisions. They were Chhandog and Vajasaneyi. The Chhandog Brahmins also known as Samavedic Brahmins are the followers of Chhandog Samhita founded by the sage Gautama Rishi and similarly Vajasaneyi Brahmins also known as Yajurvedic Brahmins are the followers of Vajasaneyi Samhita founded by the sage Yajnavalkya. During the Gupta period Mithila was a center for disputes between Buddhists, Jains and Brahmins, with prominent Mimamsa authors writing defenses of Vedic ritual. Education took place through "Tols, Pathshāla and Chatušpathi or Chaupari," with students living at the house of their teacher.

The Turkic conquests had little impact in Mithila, leaving it as "an isolated outpost and centre of Brahmanic and Sanskrit scholarship," where "Hindu scholars were able to protect the purity of their ideals and traditions."

After the independence of India, the Maharaja Kameshwar Singh of the Raj Darbhanga in Mithila, established a research institute called as Mithila Sanskrit Shodh Sansthan (Mithila Sanskrit Research Institute) in the year 1951 to preserve the cultural heritage of the tradition of Sanskrit and Vedic learning in Mithila. It was inaugurated by the first president Dr Rajendra Prasad of India.

== School of Nyaya ==
Nyaya is one of the six schools of Indian philosophy, known for its studies on logic. The foundational text are the Nyāya Sūtras, traditionally attributed to the Vedic sage Akshapada Gautama at his Gautam Ashram in Mithila, but possibly composed by multiple authors between 6th-century BCE and 2nd-century BCE. A scholar specialised in the subject of Nyaya philosophy was called as Naiyayika. There was a specialised village for the seat of Nyaya Pradhan (translates to "head of Naiyayika") in Mithila. The village was known as Tarkik Gram, presently it is called as Targaon.

Vachaspati Mishra (9th c. CE) was a well-known Vedic scholar and teacher, who wrote Nyāyasucinibandha on Nyāya-sūtras, Nyāyakānika which is an Advaita work on science of reasoning, Tattvasamikṣa and Nyāya-vārttika-tātparyaṭīkā which is a sub commentary on the Nyāya-sūtras. The place where he lived and taught is known as Vachaspati Mishra Dih located at Thadi village in the Madhubani district.

Later in the 10th century CE, Udayanacharya founded Nyayakusumanjali which reconciled the views of the two independent schools Nyaya and Vaisheshika of the Indian philosophy. The location of his academy where he taught his disciples is presently known as Udayanacharya Dih in Samastipur district of the Mithila region. Nyayakusumanjali became the root for the foundation of the new version of Logic known Navya Nyaya.

In 13th -14th century CE, Navya Nyaya school was founded by Gangesha Upadhyaya. He wrote Tattvachintamani which was the authoritative text in the Navya Nyaya school of the Indian philosophy. During the period of 14th century CE, the other eminent Naiyayika was Ayachi Mishra. He taught his disciples free of cost. His academy was located in the Sarisav Pahi village of the Mithila region. The remains of the site of his academy is presently known as Ayachi Mishra Dih. He also taught his own son Sankara Mishra. His son Sankara Mishra also became a great scholar of Nyaya Shastra.

In the 14th-15th century CE, Pakshadhara Mishra was an eminent Naiyayika and the head teacher of Nyaya Shastra in Mithila. He was a court member at the court of King Bhairava Singh of the Oiniwar Dynasty in Mithila. His academy was situated at Bhaur near the Sarisav Pahi village. His notable pupils were Vasudeva Sarvabhauma and Raghunatha Siromani. They came from Nadia in Bengal to Mithila for learning Nyaya philosophy with the teacher Pakshadhara Mishra.

Late mediaeval Eastern schools of Brahmins were focused on Nyaya Shastra and logical sciences, in contrast to the Vedanta of southern Brahmins from the Vijayanagara cultural area. According to Vidyabhusana, the science of logic developed out of parishad, councils of learned Brahmins. The Mithila school of Nyaya was an Indian school of Nyaya philosophy, which flourished from the 12th-13th to the 15th century in Mithila.

During the mediaeval period, Shalaka Pariksha and Shadyantra Pariksha were the examinations conducted for graduation from the institution. Mahesha Thakura, the founder of Darbhanga Raj, later introduced Dhaut Pariksha. Students were not allowed to take any piece of written information with them after finishing their studies, to keep a monopoly on the study of Logic.

In the late 20th century, the tradition of Sanskrit and Vedic learning in Mithila continued by the establishment of the modern formal university known as Kameshwar Singh Darbhanga Sanskrit University at the campus of the royal palace called Anand Bagh Palace of the Darbhanga Raj. Presently it is a state university in the state of Bihar.

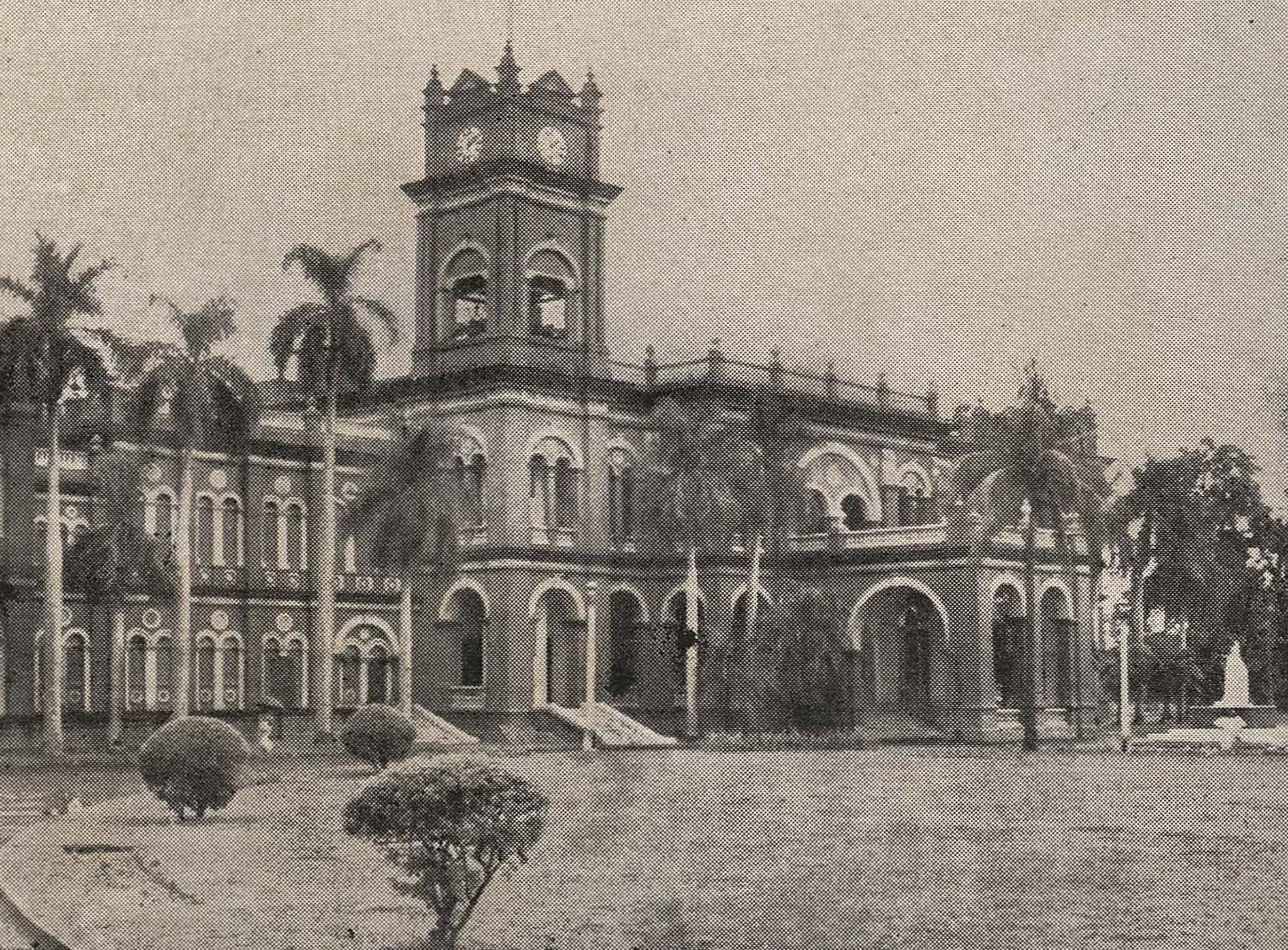
Sanskrit University Building at Darbhanga donated by the Darbhanga Maharajadhiraj.

== School of Sankhya ==
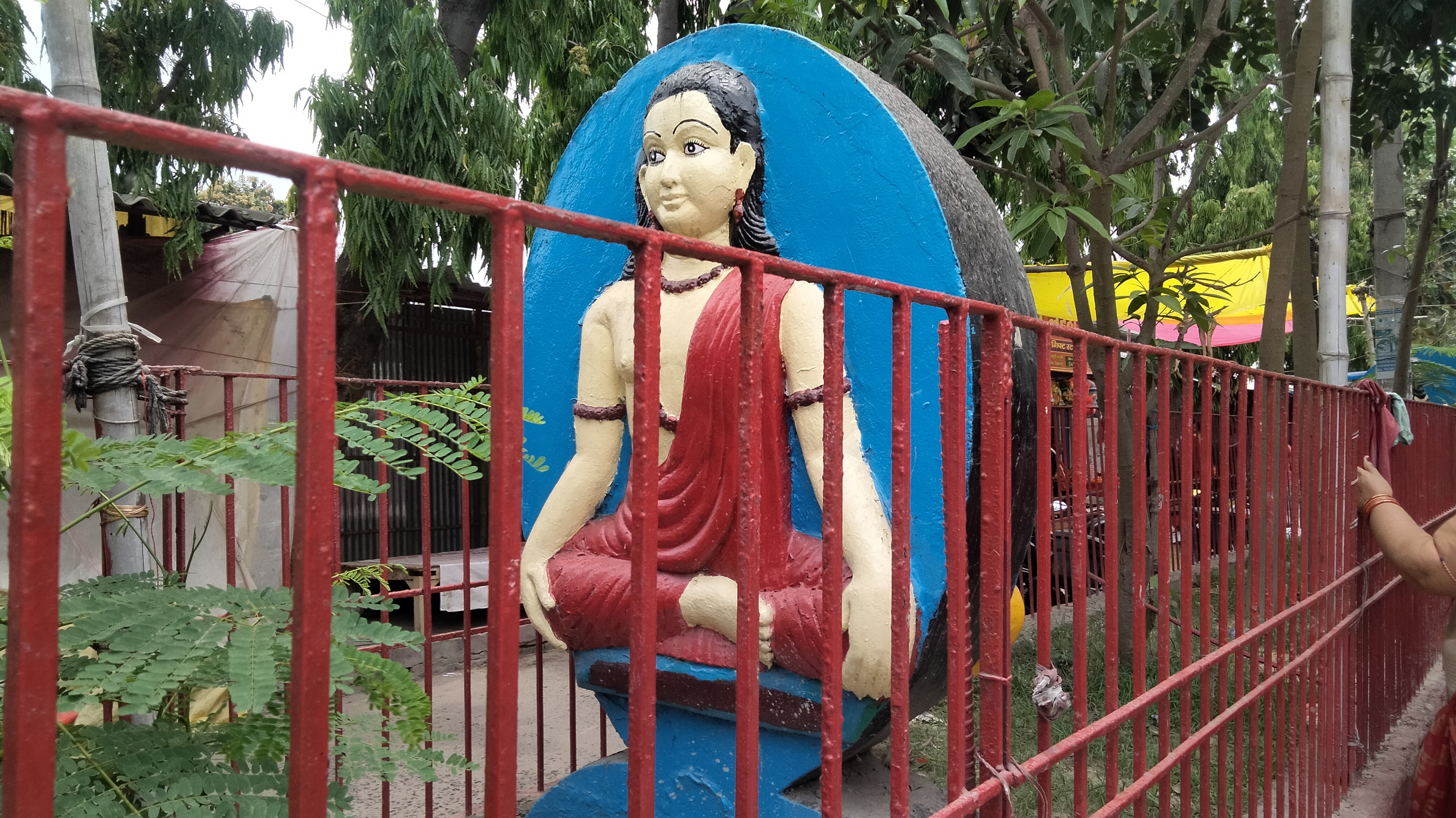
Memorial Statue of the sage Kapila (founder of Samkhya philosophy) at the entrance gate of the Uchchaith Bhagawati Mandir Complex

Sāṃkhya is one of the six schools in the Indian philosophy attributed to the Vedic sage Maharshi Kapila. His academic and residential location is known Kapila Ashram in Mithila. It is located at the Kapileshwar Sthan Mandir in the Madhubani district of Bihar in India. According to legend it is believed that the Videha King Janaka came to the ashram of the Vedic sage Kapila in Mithila to learn Samkhya philosophy from the sage. The tradition of Samkhya school was later carried by the sage Asuri and further it was transmitted to the sage Panchashikha. After that Panchashikha taught it to the King Janadeva Janaka and later to the King Dharmadhwaja Janaka in Mithila. In the medieval period, Vachaspati Mishra was an eminent philosopher of the text Samkhya Shastra.

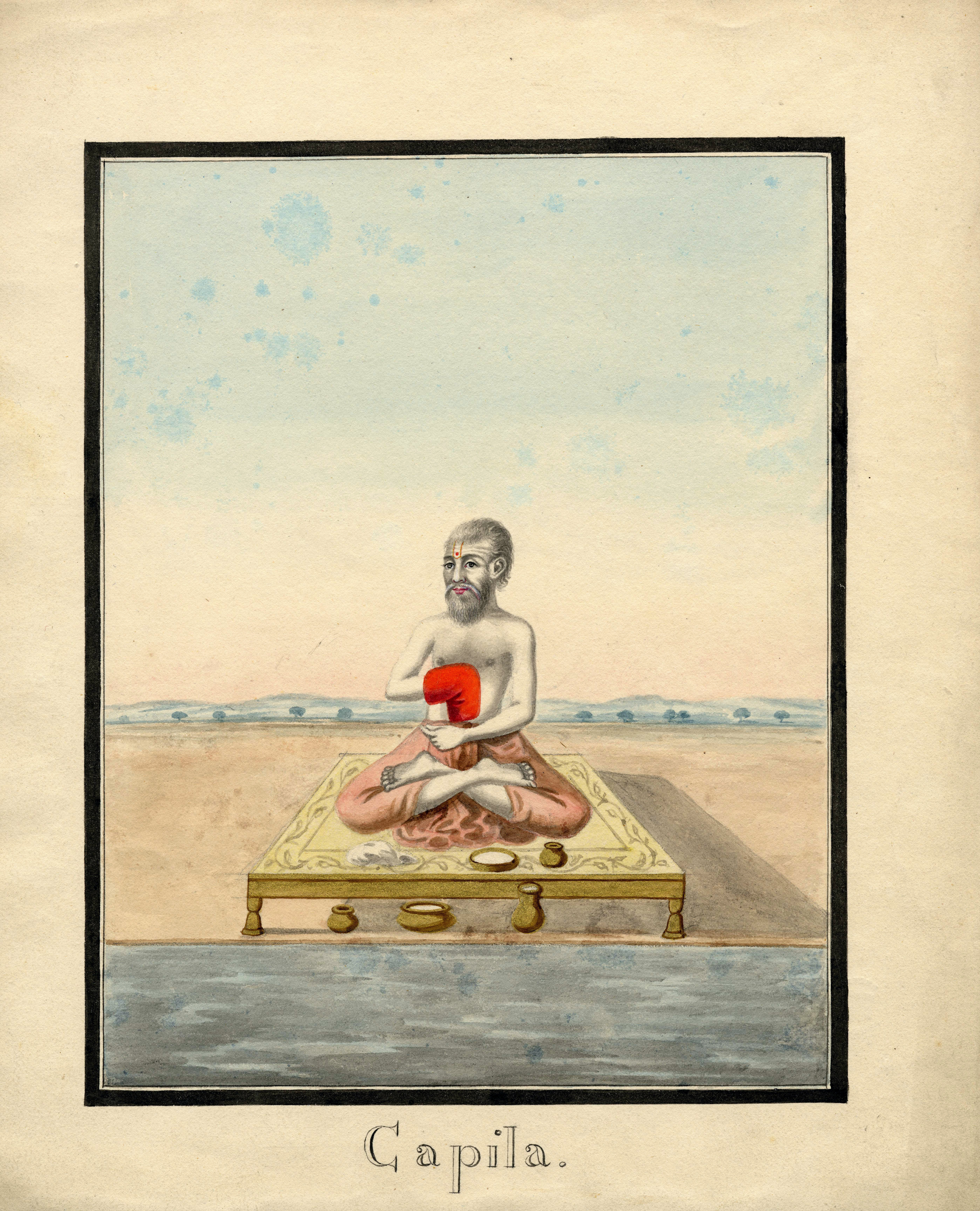
Artistic image: The Vedic sage Maharshi Kapila

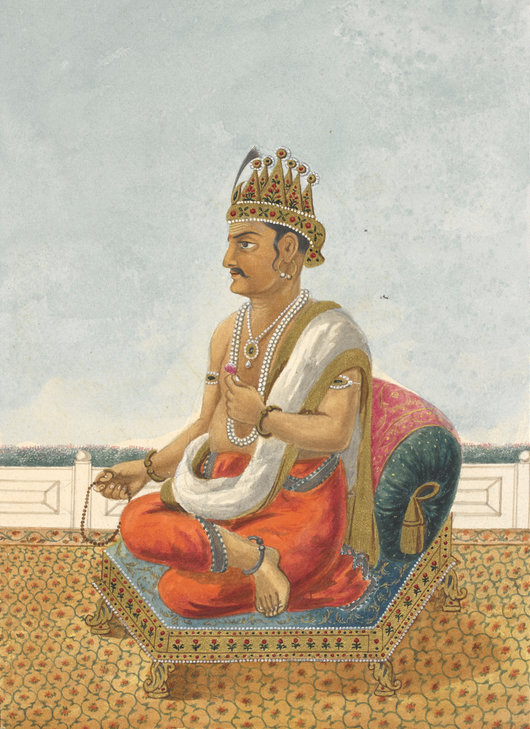
Portrait of Janaka, c. 1803-1804 CE

== School of Vaisheshika ==
Statue of Maharshi Kanada (Composer of the Vaiśeṣika Sūtra) at the entrance of the Uchchaith Bhagwati Mandir.

Vaisheshika is one of the six schools in the Indian philosophy attributed to the Vedic sage Maharshi Kannada. In the 15th century CE, the Indian philosopher Sankara Mishra was a famous scholar of the Vaisheshika Shastra. He wrote a commentary text on the Vaisheshika Sutras of the Maharshi Kannada. The commentary text is known as Upaskara. It is an authentic preserved text on the original Vaisheshika Sutras. He learnt the philosophy of Vaisheshika from his own father Ayachi Mishra.

== School of Astronomy and Jyotisha ==
In Mithila, there were several Maithil Brahmin scholars involved in learning and teaching of astronomical treatise and Jyotisha. The Khandawala Dynasty's founder King Mahesha Thakura was a prominent astronomer in the tradition of Sanskrit and Vedic learning in Mithila. After him, Hemangada Thakura was an eminent Acharya of astronomy. He authored an astronomical treatise Grahan Mala, detailing dates of the solar and the lunar eclipses from 1620 AD to 2708 AD. He was also the ruler of the Mithila Kingdom. Similarly his uncle Parmananda Thakura was also an astronomer, he wrote an astronomical treatise called Siddhaanta Sudhaa.

== School of Panji ==
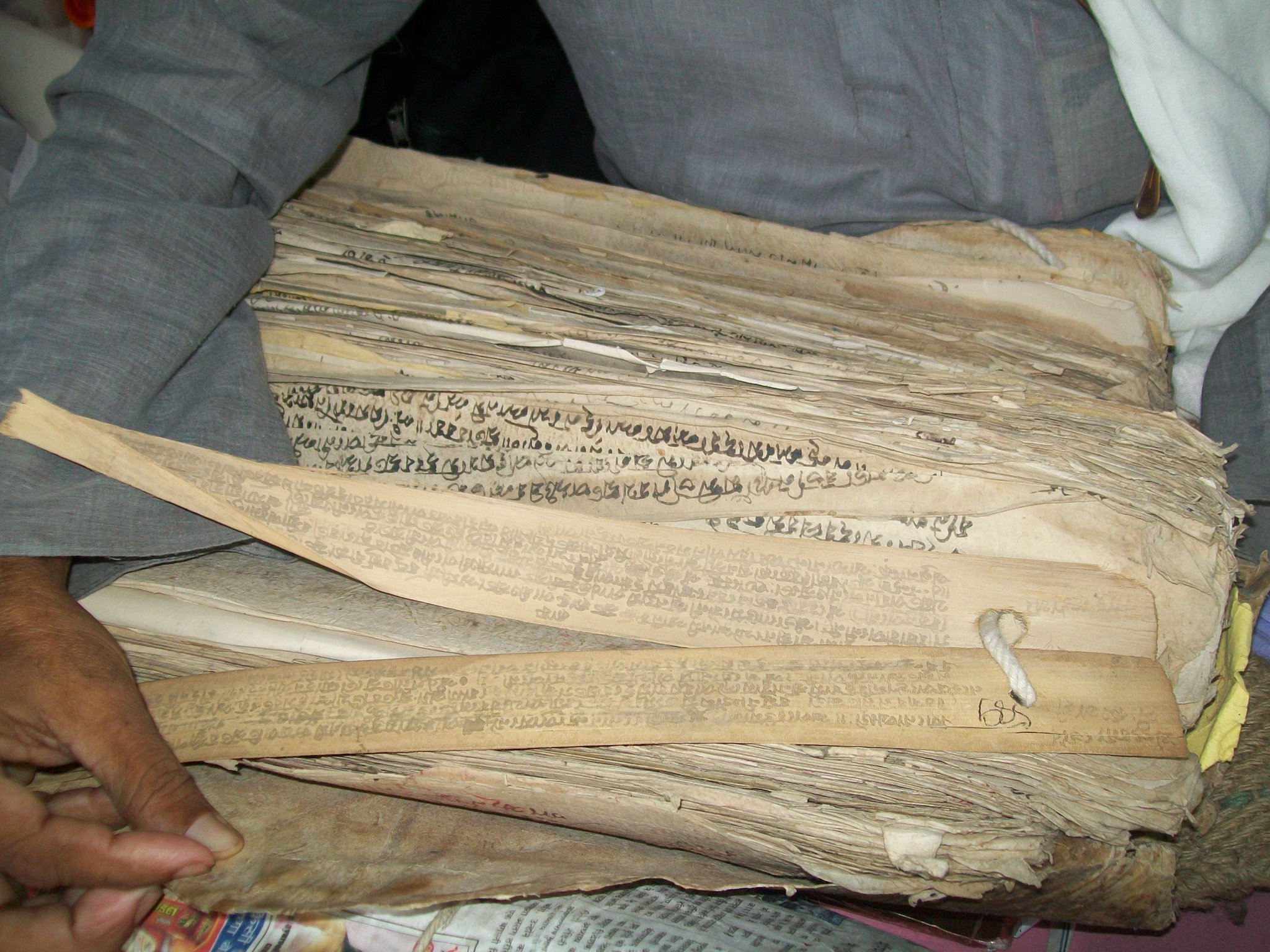
Genealogical Records in Mithila

Since 14 century CE, Mithila has a systematic record of the genealogical datas of the Maithil Brahmins and Maithil Kayastha in the region. It is known as Panji. The registrar of the Panji system is known as Panjikar. The eligibility criteria for becoming Panjikar was passing the Dhaut Pariksha in Mithila. There was a 10 years course for Panjikar, taught at the court of the kingdom in Mithila. In the region of the kingdom, the institute of Panji was established in the 14 villages by the Karnat king Harsimhadeva in Mithila. At these locations a large campus of mango groves known as Sabha Gachhi were also built, where a large number of Maithil Brahmins gathered for selecting their future sons in law for their daughters. These institutions at these 14 villages were maintaining and keeping records of the genealogy of the Maithil Vivah in the region. Among the 14 Sabha Gachhis, the Saurath Sabha was most popular and still alive ceremonially.

== Sources ==
- Bronkhorst, Johannes (2007). Greater Magadha: Studies in the Culture of Early India. BRILL. ISBN 9789004157194.
- Bronkhorst, Johannes; Diaconescu, Bogdan; Kulkarni, Malhar (2013), "The Arrival of Navya-Nyaya Techniques in Varanasi", in Pandikattu, Kuruvilla; Pichalakkattu, Binoy (eds.), An Indian Ending. Rediscovering the Grandeur of Indian Heritage for a Sustainable Future. Essays in Honour of Professor Dr. John Vattanky SJ On Completing Eighty Years, Delhi: Serial Publishers
- Chaudhury, P.C. Roy (1964), Bihar District Gazetteers: Darbhanga, Superintendent Secretariat Press
- Dalal, Roshen (2014), Hinduism: An Alphabetical Guide, Penguin Books
- Glucklich, Ariel (2008), The Strides of Vishnu: Hindu Culture in Historical Perspective, Oxford University Press
- Jha, Bishwambhar (2010), "Education in Early Mithila: A Reappraisal", Proceedings of the Indian History Congress, 71: 160–164
- Olivelle, Patrick (1998). The Early Upanisads. Oxford University Press. ISBN 978-0195124354.
- Rorabacher, J. Albert (2016), Bihar and Mithila. The Historical Roots of Backwardness, Taylor & Francis
- Samuel, Geoffrey (2010), The Origins of Yoga and Tantra. Indic Religions to the Thirteenth Century, Cambridge University Press
- Scharfe, Hartmut (2002). "Chapter 10". Education in Ancient India (PDF). Vol. 16th. Netherlands: Brill. pp. 189–191. ISBN 90-04-12556-6.
- Sharma, Ram Nath; Sharma, Rajendra Kumar (1996), History of Education in India
- Singh (2021). "A HISTORICAL STUDY OF LIBRARIES OF MEDIEVAL INDIA" (PDF). International Journal of Scientific & Innovative Research Studies. 9 – via CSIRS.
- Vidyabhusana, Mahamahopadhyaya Satis Chandra (1920). A History of Indian Logic (Ancient, Mediaeval and Modern Schools). Library Genesis. Motilal Banarsidass.
- Vidyabhusana, Satis Chandra (1988). A History of Indian Logic: Ancient, Mediaeval and Modern Schools. Motilal Banarsidass Publishers. ISBN 978-81-208-0565-1.
- Mukherjee, Radha Kumud (1951) [1947]. "XXIV. Universities". Ancient Indian Education (Brahmanical and Buddhist) (2nd ed.). Motilal Banarsidass. pp. 597–598.
- Choudhary, Indra Kumar (1988). Some Aspects of Social Life of Medieval Mithila, 1350-1750 A.D.: With a Special Reference to Contemporary Literatures. Kashi Prasad Jayaswal Research Institute. p. 91. "In Mithila we get references to altogether three types of examinations during the period under review : (i) Shalaka Pariksha, (ii) Dhout Pariksha, and (iii) Shadyantra Pariksha."
- Thakur, Upendra (1956). History of Mithila (Circa 3000 B.C.-1556 A.D.). Darbhanga: Mithila Institute. pp. 379–381.
- "The University of Nadia". The Dawn and Dawn Society's Magazine. September 1907. p. 70.
