= Sanskrit and Vedic learning in Nadia =

Ancient university in Nadia

University of ancient Nadia
- प्राचीन नदिया विश्वविद्यालय (Sanskrit)
- Nadia University
- Type: Center of Sanskrit and Vedic learning
- Cultures: Hinduism
- Location: Nadia district
- Region: Bengal

History
- Built: 11th century CE
- Built by: Lakshmana Sena

Nadia was a centre of Sanskrit and Vedic learning in Bengal. It was one of the prominent centres for Sanskrit learning in the ancient Indian subcontinent. It became popular for the study of Navya Nyaya Shastra also known as New Logic. Navya Nyaya was the new version of the ancient Nyaya school of the Indian philosophy. It was situated at the confluence of the Ganga and Jalangi rivers in the present Nadia district. It had three centers for imparting education. They were Navadvipa, Gopalpura, and Shantipur.

== History ==
In the 11th century CE, the eastern part of Bengal was ruled by Sena Dynasty. They established their capital of the kingdom at Nadia. After that a learning centre was established at the capital city Nabadwip in Nadia. The court of the king Lakshmana Sena was made a centre of learnings. In his court, there was a renowned scholar named as Halayudha known for his scholarly works. The scholar was appointed as the prime minister of the kingdom. He composed several notable texts on the Indian philosophy. His notable literary works were Brahmana Sarvasva, Smriti Sarvasva, Mimansa Sarvasva and Nyaya Sarvasva. In the patronage of the king Lakshmana Sena, Nadia emerged as a famous university where students from different parts of the Bengal region came to study Sanskrit literature and education.

The university of Nadia was one of the major centres of Hindu learning during the period from 13th century CE to the 16th century CE in the Indian subcontinent. Like the Ancient Mithila University, it also became famous for the study of Nyaya Shastra in region of Bengal.

In the 15th century CE, the eminent Naiyayika Vasudeva Sarvabhauma who studied Nyaya Shastra at the university of Mithila and memorised the two prominent texts Tattavachintamani and Nyayakushmanjali of the Nyaya school, came to his home town Nadia. There he established his own academy for teaching Nyaya Shastra. It was supposed to be the first academy at the university of ancient Nadia which facilitated the learning of Nyaya Shastra there. After that a brilliant student named Raghunatha Shiromani came to the academy of Vasudeva Sarvabhauma. He studied Nyaya Shastra in the guidance of Vasudeva Sarvabhauma there. It is said that those days the university of Nadia had not achieved the status to confirm degree in the subject of Nyaya Shastra. For achieving the status to confirm degree in the subject of Nyaya Shastra, it was necessary that a representative scholar of the university should had to defeat the teachers of the university of Mithila in philosophical debate (Shastrartha). So for that purpose the teacher Vasudeva Sarvabhauma sent his brilliant disciple Raghunatha Shiromani to the university of Mithila as a student. There he was admitted in the academy of the head teacher Pakshadhara Mishra. According to an essay published by the Calcutta University Magazine in 1907, Raghunath Shiromani received the right to confer degrees from the Mithila University in 1503, from which date the Nadia University is considered to be formally established.

== Description ==
In 18th century CE, Maikinon prepared an article about the university of ancient Nadia on the basis of information he received from a Maulvi and a Pandit. He red out the article on 28 July 1785 at The Asiatic Society of Kolkata in the presence of Sir William Jones but it is said that the article was not preserved later in the society.
