= Naiyayika =

Scholar specialised in Nyaya Shastra

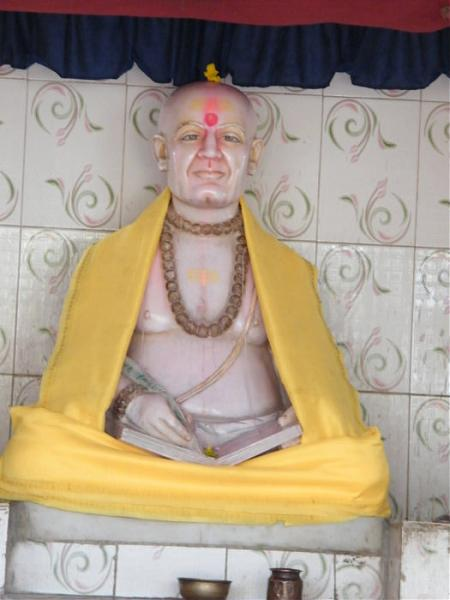
- Image of the 10th century CE "Naiyāyika" Udayanacharya

Occupation
- Synonym: Logician
- Occupation type: Philosopher
- Specialty: Nyaya Shastra; Indian Logic

Description
- Competencies: Logical reasonings, Sanskrit literature
- Education required: Master of Philosophy with specialisation in Nyaya Sutras
- Fields of employment: Department of philosophy in universities, Sanskrit universities and Vedic learning institutes
- Related jobs: Professor, Philosopher and Logician

Naiyayika (Sanskrit: नैयायिक , Romanised: Naiyāyika) is referred to a follower of the Nyāya school of the Indian philosophy founded by the Vedic sage Akshapada Gautama. Its plural form is Naiyayikas. The scholar who study and specialises in the field of Nyaya Shastra is known as Naiyayika. The Naiyayikas are also called as logicians.

The main occupations of the Naiyayikas are the investigations of the truth and acquiring correct knowledge through the process of logical reasonings. They accept the validity of the authority of the Vedas. They harmonise their own independent thoughts and concepts with that of the Vedas.

According to Naiyayikas, there are sixteen categories to attain the perfection of correct knowledges. These sixteen categories are pramāṇa, prameya, saṃśaya, prayojana, dṛṣṭānta, siddhānta, avayava, tarka, nirnaya, vāda, jalpa, vitaṇḍā, hetvābhāsa, chhala, jāti, nigrahasthāna. The Naiyayikas consider four types of proof for valid means of knowledge. These four types of proof are.

1. pratyakṣa
2. anumāna
3. upamāna
4. śabda

== Etymology ==
Naiyayika is a Sanskrit word. It is combination of two terms nyāya and ika. The literal meaning of the word Naiyayika is "knower of the Nyaya philosophy".

== History ==
There is long history of the tradition of Naiyayikas in the Indian subcontinent. The history of the tradition of Naiyayikas span nearly three thousand years back from the present time. The history of Naiyayikas started from the time when the Nyaya Sutras was founded by the Vedic sage Akshapada Gautama in Mithila. The Vedic sage Akshapada Gautama is considered as the first Naiyayika in the tradition of Vedic learning. According to the second book known as Shabha Parva in the text Mahabharata, Devashree Narada is described as a logician. He was well versed in Logic.

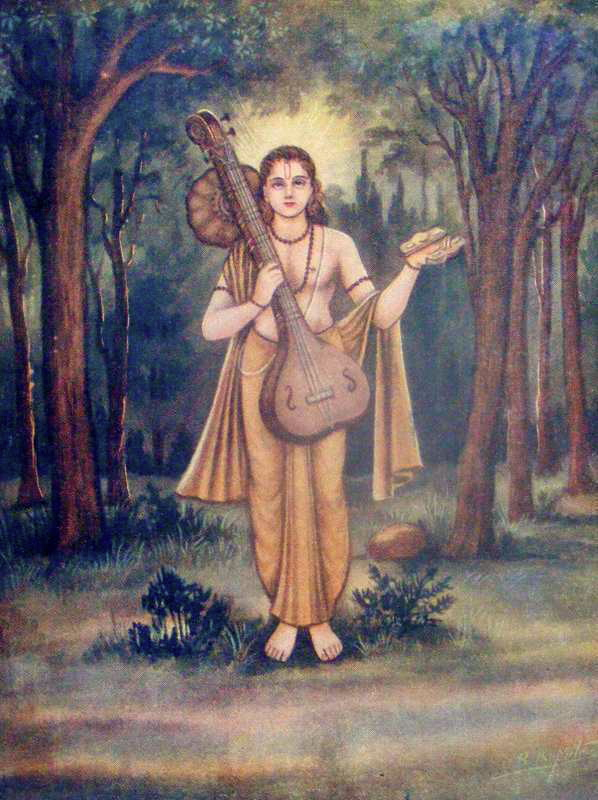
Devashree Narada described as a Logician in the text Mahabharata

During the period of 1st - 2nd century CE, the Vedic sage Vatsyayana was a prominent Naiyayika. Some scholars dated his period from 3rd century CE to 4th century CE. He wrote a commentary on the text Nyaya Sutras of Akshapada Gautama to answer the questions of Buddhists. The name of the commentary on Nyaya Sutras written by the Naiyayika Vatsyayana is known as Nyayabhashya. It is considered as the earliest commentary on the Nyaya Sutras of Akshapada Gautama.

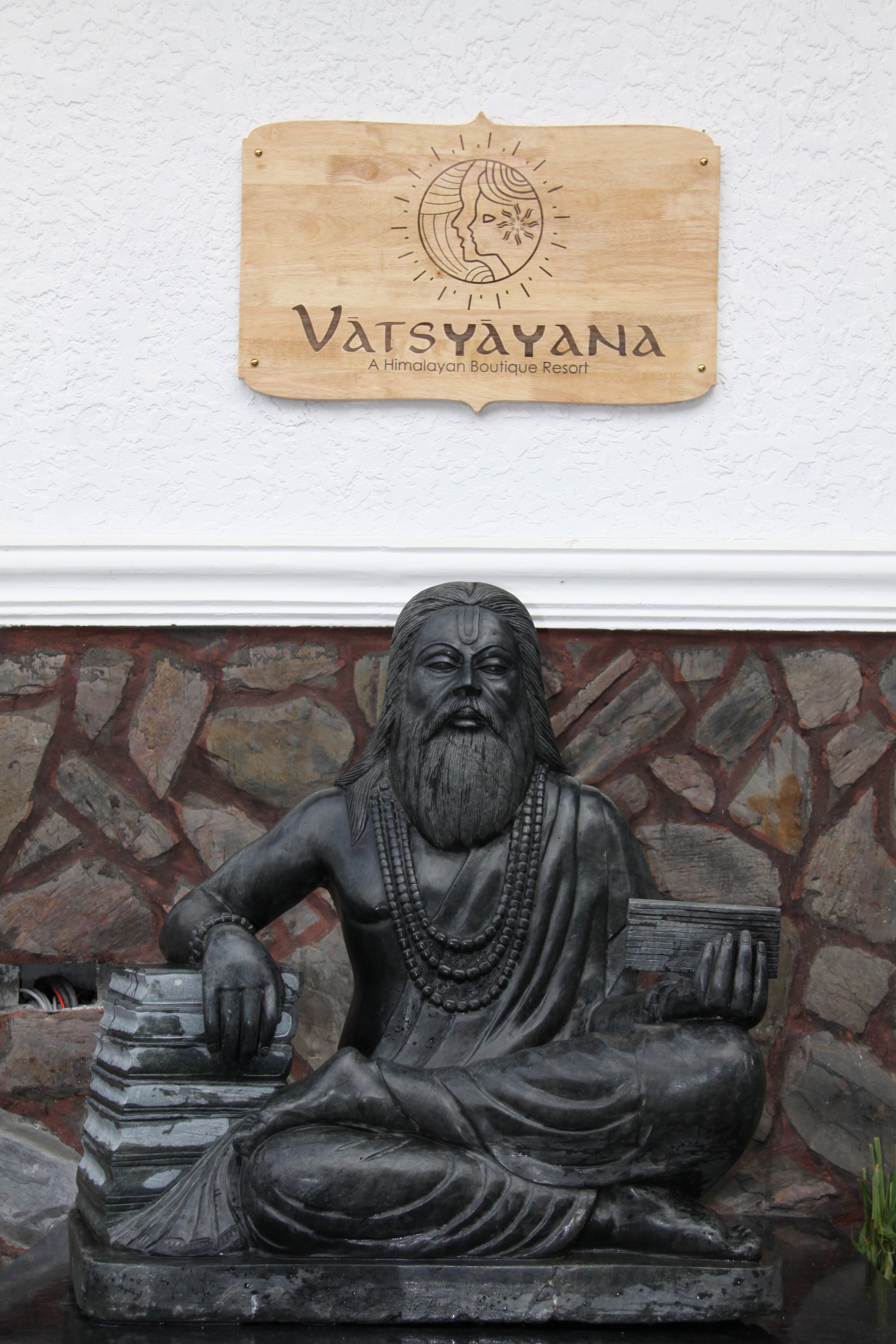
Indian philosopher "Vatsyayana" - the prominent Naiyayika of the era 1st - 2nd century CE

During the period 6th century CE to 7th century CE, Uddyotakara emerged as a prominent Naiyayika who wrote sub commentary on the Vatsyayana's commentary text Nyayabhashya. His sub commentary is known as Nyāya-vārtika. It is also called as Nyaya-bhāsya-varttika. The period of Uddyotakara variously estimated between 550 CE to 630 CE. In the 9th century CE, Vachaspati Mishra was an eminent Naiyayika in Mithila. He wrote a commentary on the Nyāya-vārtika of Uddyotakara. His commentary is known as Nyaya-varttika-tatparyatika. Similarly Jayanta Bhatta was another eminent Naiyayika during the period of the 9th - 10th century CE who wrote a commentary known as Nyayamanjari around 1000 CE. In the 10th century CE, Trilochan was also a brilliant Naiyayika who wrote a commentary named as Nyayamanjari. Even the name of the commentaries of the both Naiyayikas Jayanta Bhatta and Trilochan were same but the nature of the works were different. Bhasarvajna was another eminent Naiyayika from the Kashmir region of Indian subcontinent in the era of 10th century CE. He is known for his famous treatise Nyayasara. The treatise Nyayasara is one of the prominent texts in the Nyaya school of Indian philosophy. The literal meaning of the term Nyayasara is "The Essence of Logic". He also wrote a commentary known as Nyayabhushana on his own treatise Nyayasara.

During the period of 10th - 11th century CE, Udayanacharya emerged as a prominent Naiyayika in Mithila who reconciled the views of the two independent schools of thought Nyaya and Vaisheshika of the Indian philosophy and led the foundation of the Navya Nyaya school of thought. He founded independent treatise known as Nyayakusumanjali to prove the existence of God using logic. He attempted to devise a rational theology to counter the attack on the existence of God at the hands of Buddhist philosophers such as Dharmakīrti, Jñānaśrī and against the Chārvaka school of materialism. Apart from the text Nyayakusumanjali, he also wrote Nyāyavārttikatātparyapariśuddhi, Nyāyapariśiṣṭa, Probodhasiddhi (Bodhasiddhi), Ātmatattvaviveka, Kiraṇāvalī and Lakṣaṇāvalī.

On the basis of time period and the later development of Nyaya Shastra, the Naiyayikas are classified into two types. They are ancient Naiyayika also known as classical Naiyayika and Navya Naiyayika. The Navya Naiyayika are also called as Neo Naiyayika or New Naiyayika or Modern Naiyayika.

After the foundation of the text Nyayakusumanjali by the Naiyayika Udayanacharya, the tradition of Neo Naiyayikas started in the sub-continent. But the tradition of the Neo Naiyayikas formally got started after the foundation of the text Tattavachintamani by the Naiyayika Gangesha Upadhyaya of 12th - 13th century CE in Mithila.

During the period of 14th -15th century CE, the prominent Naiyayikas were Ayachi Mishra, Sankara Mishra, Pakshadhara Mishra, Vasudeva Sarvabhauma and Raghunatha Shiromani, etc.
