= Dih (archaeology) =

Heritage mounds or elevated sites in Mithila

Dih generally refers to historical mounds or elevated sites that often hold archaeological significance in the Mithila region of the Indian subcontinent. These sites can represent the remnants of ancient settlements, structures, or religious places. They are important for understanding the historical and cultural heritage of the Mithila region. The major dihas in the region are attributed to the prominent historical personalities of Mithila.

View of the Kalidas Dih at Uchchaith village.

== Etymology ==
Dih is a Maithili word derived from another Maithili word Dihi. The literal meaning of the term Dihi is earliest original ancestor or founder of a village. Similarly the literal meaning of the term Dih signifies the place where the original ancestor or a prominent personality of the village may had lived. Sometimes it also signifies the worship place where the folk deity Gram Devata or Brahm Baba or Dihavar Baba of the village is established.

== Description ==
Dih in Mithila signifies a location of historical and archaeological importance, often marked by mounds that hold clues to the region's past history. In the Mithila region of the Indian subcontinent, there are several historical, archaeological, religious, educational and cultural Dihas in the villages or towns of the region. The famous dihas in the region are Banauli Vidyapati Dih, Bisfi Vidyapati Dih, Ayachi Mishra Dih, Vachaspati Mishra Dih and Kumarila Bhatt Dih, etc.

Similarly at Uchchaith village in the Madhubani district, there is a historical and educational Dih known as Kalidas Dih. It is related to the Sanskrit scholar Kalidasa. The other famous dih is Musaharniya Dih at Paston Navtoli Village which has archeological evidence that it may have been a Buddhist Mahavihara, or the ruins of a royal palace in Mithila. The other dihas in the Madhubani district of the Mithila region are Parjuar dih, Garokhar Dih, Satlakha Dih, Rahika Dih, Malangiya Dih, Kanail Dih, Serma Dih, Basuara Dih, Biratpur Dih, Hathiya Dih, Teliya Dih, Raghunathpur Dih, Bhagwatipur Dih, Manserpur Dih, Vishaul Dih, Jiraul Dih, Loha Dih, Sakradhi Dih, Usarahi Dih, Bherba Dih, Sasnma Dih, Chhachhua Dih, Usauthu Dih, Koria Dih, Khoir Dih, Bharchaura Dih, Raghuni Dehat Dih, Kusahi Dih, Balaha Dih, Ekamma Dih, Chataila Dih, Dharharha Dih, Harhi Dih, Jalpayi Dih, Gadhauli Dih, Jamdhar Dih, Sukhet Dih, Wali Dih, Pali Dih, Sugauta Dih, Pauam Dih, Devpura Dih, Kapsiya Dih, Narhi Dih, and Akaur Dih, etc. These dihas had been recognised and explored by the archeological research institute named as Kashi Prasad Jayaswal Research Institute in Patna.

In the Bhagalpur district of the region, the major dihas are Kurudih, Kurpatdih, Shivaydih, Goradih, Swarupchak Dih, Saur Dih, Brahmachari Dih, Banokhar Dih, and Sanokhar Dih, etc. All the villages in which they are located are the namesakes of these dihas respectively. In all these villages there is a mound spread over an area of 50 to 300 acres. According to the archaeologist Arvind Sinha Rai, these dih-namesake villages are centuries old and some civilizations are buried beneath the mounds of these dihas.

The Udayanacharya Dih at Kariyan village is the famous dih in the Samastipur district. It was the location of residence as well as academy of the eminent Indian philosopher Udayanacharya. The mound is 20 feet high from the ground and spread over an area of 96 acres. After excavation, some antiquities of the 2nd century BC have been unearthed. Similarly, objects dating from the 6th century AD to after 1200 AD have been also found at the site. Waini Dih is another important dih within the district, at the historical village Oini. It was the first capital of the Oiniwar Dynasty in Mithila. There are ruins of the fort of the capital covered by bushes and trees.

== See also ==
- Tell (archaeology)
