= Bhairavasimha =

King of Oiniwar Dynasty in Mithila

- King of Mithila
- Predecessor: Dhirasimha
- Successor: Rupanarayana Ramabhadrasimha
- Born: Bhairava; Mithila
Names
- Bhairavasimhadeva
Regnal name
- Maharajadhiraja Bhairavasimhadeva
- Kingdom: Mithila Kingdom
- Kingdom: Tirhut Sarkar
- Dynasty: Oiniwar Dynasty
- Father: King Narasimha
- Religion: Hinduism
- Occupation: King of Mithila

Bhairavasimha (Maithili: भैरव सिंह) was the fourteenth king of the Oiniwar Dynasty in the Mithila Kingdom. He ascended the throne of the kingdom around 1475–76 CE after the King Dhirasimha.

== Early life ==
Bhairavasimha was born in the royal family of the Oiniwar Dynasty in the Mithila Kingdom. He was the son of the King Narasimha. He was a Maithil Brahmin and belonged to Kashyap Gotra.

== Rule ==
According to George Grierson, the King Bhairavasimha shortly after taking the control on the throne of the kingdom, declared the kingdom of Mithila as independent sovereign state. He issued silver coins to declare the independent sovereign status of the Mithila Kingdom. After the King Shivasimha, he was the second king of the Oiniwar Dynasty in Mithila who issued sovereign silver coins of the Mithila Kingdom to declare its independent sovereignty. He established his capital at a village known as Varuar in the Bachhaur pargana.

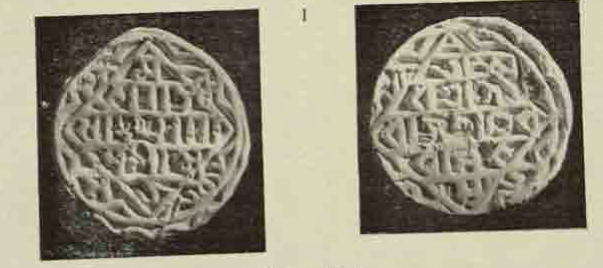
Image of the Silver coins issued by the King Bhairavasimha for declaring sovereignty of his kingdom

Bhairavasimha was a politically adept king. He had friendly relations with the king of Lanka. There was an exchange of envoys between the two countries.

== Patronage to Vedic learning ==
During the reigns of the King Bhairavasimha, a famous Yajna Tank was established at Jarahattiya near the Tarsarai railway station, where 1400 Mimansakas were living for conducting Yajna and teaching of Mimansa. Similarly, at his court there was the eminent Naiyayika called as Pakshadhara Mishra. He was the then head teacher of the Nyaya Shastra in the kingdom. The famous logicians Vasudeva Sarvabhauma and Raghunatha Siromani of Nadia in Bengal came to Mithila for learning Nyaya Shastra from the teacher Pakshadhara Mishra.

During his reign, Vardhamana Upadhyaya was appointed as the judge of the court.
