= Udayanacharya Dih =

Ancient site related to Ancient Mithila University

- Type: Public
- Founders: Udayanacharya
- Parent institution: Ancient Mithila University
- Religious affiliation: Sanatana
- Head: Udayanacharya
- Location: Kariyan village, Shivajinagar Block, Samastipur, India
- Campus: Rural

Udayanacharya Dih is the site related to the Indian philosopher Udayana. The place is located at Kariyan village of Samastipur district in Mithila region of Bihar. There are ruins of Udayanacharya Dih. Udayana wrote his famous treatise Nyayakusumanjali at this place. Udayanacharya defeated the Buddhists scholars many times in debates during 10th century.

== Description ==
The birthplace of the Indian philosopher Udayanacharya is at Karian village of Shivajinagar Block in Samastipur district of the Mithila region. His birth place at the village is called as Udayanacharya Dih or Udayan Dih. According to legends it is said that the soil here is believed as a mixture of knowledge and wisdom. It is considered as holy soil. In the village there is a tradition that every children start their letters for educational journey from the soil of this holy place. It is said that many scholars of the country have come here to apply the tilak of the holy clay on their foreheads at the Udayanacharya Dih. A local organisation Udayan Seva Sansthan organizes annual function called as "Udayan Parva" every year at this place in the memory of the great philosopher Udayanacharya.

== Excavation ==
There is a mound that is 20 feet high above the surrounding ground level and is spread over an area of 96 acres. After excavation, some antiquities of the 2nd century BC have been unearthed. Similarly, objects dating from the 6th century AD to after 1200 AD have been also found at the site. Geologists have come here several times for excavation and collected remains from the site. But due to the negligence of the governments, proper excavation and development of the site is still pending. It is said that some remains from the 9th century CE still lie under the pipal tree in the campus of the site.
