= John Vattanky =

Indian philosopher (1931–2021)

Rev. John Vattanky SJ
- Born: John Vattanky; 3 July 1931; Palakkattumala, Kottayam, Kerala, India
- Died: 22 February 2021 (aged 89); Kozhikode, Kerala, India

Education
- Education: University of Oxford (M.A. Oriental Studies); University of Vienna (Ph.D.)

Philosophical work
- Era: 20th–21st century
- Region: Indian philosophy
- School: Navya-Nyāya
- Institutions: Jnana-Deepa Vidyapeeth; De Nobili College, Pune
- Main interests: Nyaya theism; Indian logic; philosophy of language
- Notable works: Gaṅgeśa’s Philosophy of God (1984); Development of Nyāya Theism (1993)

Rev. John Vattanky SJ (3 July 1931 – 22 February 2021 (aged 89)) was a Jesuit priest, belonging to Kerala province, in India. An Indian philosopher, specializing in Gangesa's Navya-Nyāya, he resided at De Nobili College, Pune. Vattanky was a Professor Emeritus of Jnana-Deepa Vidyapeeth, Pune, India. He has contributed significantly to the growth of Indian philosophy and Indian Christian Theology. His book on Nyaya Theism has been well appreciated and acclaimed. His work on Gangesa, was favourably commented on by Kanchi Sankaracharya.

== His Life and Work ==
Professor John Vattanky was born at Palakkattumala, Kottayam in Kerala on 3 July 1931. After his high school studies (in which he stood first in the school) and after preliminary studies in the classics at the Papal Seminary, Kandy, Sri Lanka, he entered the Society of Jesus in 1950. During the course of his studies in the Society of Jesus, he gained a licentiate in Philosophy (1957) and another licentiate in Theology (1964). He was ordained priest in 1963. Then in 1966, he began his specialization in Oriental Philosophies and Religion, at the University of Oxford, England from where he took his M.A. in Oriental Studies with his optionals as Sanskrit and Pali. He went on to the University of Vienna to do his doctorate specializing in Indian philosophy.

After his Ph.D. (1974), he was in Trivandrum, Kerala, organizing a Research Centre in Indian Philosophy and Religion. During this time, he has published several scholarly research articles in standard research journals both in India and abroad. His major book, Gangesa's Philosophy of God was published in 1984 by the Adyar Research Library, Madras and has won the admiration of scholars as well as the award of all India Philosophical Association.

Then he moved on to Jnana-Deepa Vidyapeeth in Pune where he was teaching classical Indian philosophy and Sanskrit. During this time, he also developed the Centre for Advanced Indian Studies and continued his research. He also lectured in various universities in India and abroad. Many times he was visiting professor of Indian philosophy at Munich School of Philosophy in Germany.

He has also presented papers at various conferences, national and international. Thus in 1974, he presented a paper at All India Oriental Conference, Kurukshetra; in 1978, gave papers at the University of Kerala and at Sanskrit College, Trippunithara, Kerala; in 1982, he presented a paper at the Faculty of Theology of the University of Passau, Germany and at the International Conference on Buddhist studies at Oxford. In 1984, he presented a paper at the International Conference on Comparative Philosophy at Honolulu, Hawaii, U.S.A. In 1985, he presented a paper at All India Philosophical Conference, Hyderabad. In 1986, he presented papers at LMU Munich, at the Oriental Institute, University of Oxford, to the Faculty of Philosophy, University of Texas at Austin, U.S.A., and to the Faculty of Philosophy, University of Washington, U.S.A. In the same year, he was one of the main speakers at the seminar on the Nyaya System of Indian philosophy at New Delhi. In 1987, he presented a paper to the Faculty of Humanities at Thammasat University, Bangkok. In the same year he was a visiting professor at Santa Clara University, U.S.; he also gave a lecture on 'The Analytical Tradition in Indian Philosophy' to the Faculty of Philosophy of the same university.

In 1993, his book 'Development of Nyaya Theism' was published by the Intercultural Publications, New Delhi. In 1995, his book 'Nyaya Philosophy of Language' was published by the Indian Book Centre, Delhi. In the same year, he also organized a national seminar on Indian Philosophy of Language at Pune and presented a paper on 'Indian Hermeneutics'. In 1998, he was a visiting fellow at Clare Hall, Cambridge. In the same year, he lectured at the Shimla Institute of Advanced Study on 'Nyaya System of Philosophy an Important Aspect of Indian Culture'. Further in the same year, he lectured at Santiniketan on "Nyaya Theism and Nyaya Hermeneutics', participated in a seminar at Dunlod, New Delhi and presented a paper on Nyaya. In 1995, he was a visiting Life-member of Clare Hall, University of Cambridge, England. In the same year, he delivered lectures for the refresher course for University teachers in Lucknow. In 2000, he gave a lecture at a seminar on Nyaya Logic at the International Centre, Delhi. In the same year, he also gave lectures at the Institute of Indology and the Faculty of Theology, University of Tübingen, Germany, at the Visva-Bharati University in Shantiniketan and participated in the conference on the dialogue of civilizations at India International Centre, New Delhi and presented a paper on 'Argumentation in Nyaya'. In 2001, he was a visiting Life Member at Clare Hall, University of Cambridge, England. In 2002, he participated in the International conference on Syriac Studies at Kottayam, Kerala.

In 2003, he was a visiting Life Member at Clare Hall, University of Cambridge, England; in the same year he also gave a lecture on 'Sankara and Christian Theology' at the Faculty of Theology, University of Tübingen, Germany. Further, in the same year he participated in the International Philosophy Conference at Istanbul, Turkey and presented a paper on "Nyaya and Buddhist Logic'. In 2004, he was a visiting Scholar at Campion Hall, University of Oxford; in the same year he also participated in an International Conference on Theology at Beirut and presented a paper on Sankara and Eastern Theology'. In 2005, he participated in an International Conference on Eastern Theology in Beirut and presented a paper on Sankara and Apophatic Theology'. Further in the same year, he presided at the inaugural session of a seminar organized by the Indian Council of Philosophical Research, Imphal, Manipur and afterwards presented a paper on 'Word and Meaning'; he was also a visiting Scholar at Campion Hall, University of Oxford. In 2006, he participated in the International Conference at Bialowieza, near Warsaw, Poland and presented a paper on 'Theism, the Culmination of Nyaya Logic'; in the same year he was also a visiting Scholar at Campion Hall, Oxford.

In 2007, he participated in an International Conference on Nyaya and Formal Logic at Jadavpur, Kolkata and presented a paper on 'The Integral Humanism of Nyaya'; in the same year he was also a visiting scholar at Campion Hall, University of Oxford. In 2008, he presented a paper on 'Ephrem and Sankara; a Dialogue Between Two Creative Thinkers' at an International conference in Granada, Spain. In 2009, he participated in the National Conference on Logic and its Application at the Mathematical Institute, Chennai. In 2010, he participated in the International Conference on Syriac Theology at SEERI, Kottayam, and presented a paper on 'Understanding Christian Eschatology Against the Background of the Thought of Ephrem and Sankara'. Professor Vattanky was one of the much sought after resource persons in refresher courses for University lecturers from all parts of India. He has thus lectured for such groups in Lucknow, Pune, Santi Niketan and so on. He was also a visiting scholar at the Centre for Advanced Studies in Simla. He participated in various seminars on Classical Indian Philosophy. Although the Centre for Advanced Indian Studies formerly directed by him is materially a small institute, it pursues intensively research in one of the most difficult systems of Indian thought- the Nyaya system which has a history of more than twenty centuries. The Institute specializes in what is called NavyaNyaya which traditionally is dated from 13th Century to the present day. The Institute has already translated and interpreted important sections of authoritative works on Navya-Nyāya and these works have won the admiration of scholars working in the field.

After a stroke and prolonged bed-rest he died at Kozhikode on 22 February 2021.

Some of His Writings

- A System of Indian Logic: The Nyaya Theory of Inference: Analysis, Text, Translation and Interpretation of the anumana section of Karikavali, Muktavali and Dinakari. Routledge, 2002. ISBN 978-0700713882
- Gangesa's Philosophy of God. John Vattanky - 1986 - Philosophy East and West 36 (4):429-430.
- Śaśadhara's Īśvaravāda: An Important Source of Gangeśa's Īśvaravāda. [REVIEW]John Vattanky - 1979 - Journal of Indian Philosophy 7 (3):257-266.
- An Indian Ending: Rediscovering the Grandeur of Indian Heritage for a Sustainable Future: Essays in Honour of Professor Dr. John Vattanky Sj on Completing Eighty Years.John Vattanky, Kuruvila Pandikattu & Binoy Pichalakkattu (eds.) - 2013 - Serials Publications.
- Aspects of Early Nyāya Theism. John Vattanky - 1978 - Journal of Indian Philosophy 6 (4):393-404.
- Development of Nyāya Theism. John Vattanky - 1993 - Intercultural Publications. ISBN 8185574057
- Is Theism Central to Nyaya? John Vattanky - 2000 - Indian Philosophical Quarterly 27 (4):411-420
- Proof for the Existence of God in Classical Indian Philosophy. John Vattanky - 2007 - Forum Philosophicum: International Journal for Philosophy 12 (1):1 - 15.
- Philosophy of Indian Logic From a Comparative Perspective. John Vattanky - 2007 - The Proceedings of the Twenty-First World Congress of Philosophy 7:179-183.
- Semantic Competency (Yogyatā). John Vattanky - 1995 - Journal of Indian Philosophy 23 (2):151-178.
- Translation and Interpretation of Kārikāvalī, Muktāvalī, and Dinakarī: Nyāya philosophy of language: Analysis, text, translation, and interpretation of Upamāna and Śabda sections of Kārikāvalī, Muktāvalī, and Dinakarī. John Vattanky - 1995 - Sri Satguru Publications. ISBN 9788170304357
- The Inference of Gangeśa to Establish the Existence of God. John Vattanky - 1982 - Journal of Indian Philosophy 10 (1):37-50.
- The Referent of Words: Universal or Individual, the Controversies Between Mīmāmsakas and Naiyāyikas. [REVIEW]John Vattanky - 1993 - Journal of Indian Philosophy 21 (1):51-78.

== His Philosophical Vision ==
When one has studied the foundational texts of a school of philosophy, naturally one's own philosophy would also be much influenced by these works. It was a fortunate set of circumstances that helped him to delve deeply into some of the basic texts of Nyaya. In particular, he analysed each sentence and even each word in the Isvaravada section of Gangesa's Tattvacintāmaṇi. The wider implications of the explanations and argumentations developed in this text began to dawn upon him quietly and consistently. Why is it that according to Nyaya logic, it is possible to establish the existence of God while in the Buddhist logical system it is not possible to establish the existence of God? An adequate answer to this question lies in the concept of knowledge of the different systems leading to different kinds of understanding of human beings themselves. Thus Nyaya system has as horizon a theory of knowledge which renders possible the discourse about God; it could even be asserted that according to Nyaya, the Absolute becomes the horizon of all knowledge and therefore also of all human activities.

Such an understanding of Nyaya helped him to develop his own philosophy. A human being can be fully understood only if his metaphysical relation with the Absolute is accepted as a constitutive principle of his very being. In other words, an integral humanism calls for transcendence. Such a view naturally rejects a purely empiricist understanding of a human being. This means that the fullness of being human can be achieved only in and through the transcendent. This is because the transcendent remains not only at the theoretical level but at the actual existential plane the center of human beings and hence it invests human life with a unique value and significance not confined merely to the world that is experienced by the senses. However, this world is not denied; it has its value. It is in and through this world that transcendence operates. Therefore, being human is being fully immersed in this world and fully in the transcendent. Hence to present a humanism without placing the transcendent at its center is to impoverish human beings; it will be the greatest injustice to them.

But concretely, what is the nature of this transcendence? In order to grasp this and to develop his original view of it, the Advaita Vedanta of Sankara especially as interpreted by the late Richard De Smet has been very helpful to him. De Smet rejects the all too common acosmic interpretation of Sankara and asserts that the true nature of the Supreme Brahman as person, ultimate cause, capable of love and grace. Therefore, the highest Brahman is more than a vast ocean of pure consciousness, but in such a way that the simplicity, plenitude and transcendence of the divine are in no way compromised. It is clear that here non-duality (advaita) is read as a doctrine of creation rather than as a teaching of illusionistic monism. The Supreme Brahman is also a person in a pre-eminent sense. The concept of person in itself does not involve any limitation and hence Brahman considered even in the strict Advaita perspective of Sankara's Vedanta is most properly and eminently personal, indeed the Super-person.

This Brahman or God can be described in many ways, but chiefly in the negative, the superlative, the world-relational, the ego-relational and the essential manner. The negative description differentiates God from all other reals by stating that it is not so, it is not so (neti neti). Such description teaches us that no term or concept can express God properly because the expressive power of terms and concepts is restricted to the empirical and hence it denies all idea of finitude in God. Asserting absolute transcendence of God, saving our mind from all temptations of pantheism, this description leads us to apophatic theology. The superlative portrayal of God accounts for the negative description. Because God is Fullness of Being, supreme in every regard He is unlike anything finite. God is the Fullness (purna) of all illimitable perfections; He is the very fullness; He is intensive fullness, not fullness by addition. He is thus the most desirable, the supreme value. He is homogeneous goodness (ekarasa). We have no example of such fullness in our experience. Yet all the beings we know directly have a relation of similarity to God and they can enrich our idea of God. The world-relational definition of God asserts that he is the sole cause of the universe. God provides both the reality and the orderly structure and course of the universe. But this does not imply any change in God; He just gives reality and order from its own fullness. Such a causality of God is so universal and ontologically complete that it is the innermost self of every single entity. The ego-relational description of God operates with reference to the knowing individual self. Each one knows from one's own experience that the ego is agent, enjoyer and knower, but its tadatmya relation with God is not known. The fundamental nature of the self is its relationship with God. And God being the innermost self of man, the former imparts his luster to the individual even to his body and organs especially the intellect. The final description of God is essential. God's essence, is truth, knowledge and being infinite. The two terms reality and knowledge together indicate that in God there is no distinction or composition.

In Sankara, the external world is described as upadhi, translated usually as limiting adjunct. But nobody really explains what it really means. He interprets it with reason as symbol; the world is a symbol of God - this is the thought of the only real poet theologian in the Christian tradition, St. Ephrem, a fourth-century saint who lived and worked in Nisbis and then in Edessa. The Supreme reality is communicated to us in the universe which is a vast assembly of symbols singing the goodness of God and this is his philosophy. Infinite are the possibilities of developing this line of thought inspired by the intuitions of Sankara and Ephrem. A Festschrift, Logic and Love: Reflecting on Professor John Vattanky's Contribution to Indian Philosophy and Spirituality, was brought in his honour in 2019. An earlier festschrift An Indian Ending: Rediscovering the Grandeur of Indian Heritage for a Sustainable Future: Essays in Honour of Professor Dr. John Vattanky SJ on Completing Eighty Years was published in 2013.

== Final Days ==
He served as founder/director, Centre for Advanced Indian Studies, Kanjirapally, Kerala, which was earlier located at De Nobili College, Pune, India. He was active in research and publication in Indian philosophy. Even in his emeritus status, he had been physically active, intellectually keen and spiritually alert. He wrote numerous articles, attended seminars and was available for guidance. In June 2013, from De Nobili College (Jnana Deepa Pontifical Institute), Pune, he moved to Kerala. After suffering illnesses after a stroke for more than six years, he had a stroke on 30 December 2014 and was recuperating at Christ Hall, Kozhikode, Kerala. He died at 4:30 am, 22 February 2021.

== Books in his honour ==
Pandikattu, Kuruvilla; Pichalakkattu, Binoy (eds.) (2013). An Indian Ending: Rediscovering the Grandeur of Indian Heritage for a Sustainable Future – Essays in Honour of Professor Dr. John Vattanky SJ on Completing Eighty Years. New Delhi: Serials Publications. ISBN 9788183875936.

Karimundackal, Thomas; Pandikattu, Kuruvilla (eds.) (2019). Logic and Love: Reflecting on Professor John Vattanky’s Contribution to Indian Philosophy and Spirituality. New Delhi/Pune: Christian World Imprints & Jnana Deepa. ISBN 9789351483717.
