= Vasudeva Sarvabhauma =

13-14th century Nyaya scholar from Mithila

- वासुदेव सार्वभौम
- Born: Nabadwip
- Occupation: Philosopher Professor

Education
- Education: Ancient Mithila University

Philosophical work
- Era: 13th century - 14th century
- School: Navya Nyaya School of Indian Philosophy
- Institutions: Mithila; Ancient Nabadwip University
- Language: Sanskrit
- Notable works: Navya Nyaya ( New Logic )

Vasudeva Sarvabhauma ( Sanskrit: वासुदेव सर्वभौम ) was an Indian Philosopher and a scholar of Nyaya Shastra. He is also known as Sarvabhauma Bhattacharya. He lived around 13th to 14th century of the Common Era. He belonged to Nabadwip and went to Mithila for studying Nyaya Shastra. He was a student of Pakshadhara Mishra, the head professor of Nyaya Shastra in the Ancient Mithila University at that time. He memorized the entire texts of learning available there and then returned to Nabadwip to establish his own school for the study of logic ( Navya Nyaya or New Logic ) He was one of the founders of Navya Nyaya School of Indian Philosophy.

== Early life ==
Vasudeva Sarvabhauma was born in a Brahmin family at Vidyanagar about four kilometres from Nabadwip town of Nadia district of present West Bengal. His father's name was Maheshvara Visarada. He studied Sanskrit literature and grammar from his own father.

== Later life ==
Vasudeva Sarvabhauma went to the university of Mithila at the age of 25 for studying Nyaya Shastra there. He was admitted in the academy of Pakshadhara Mishra. At that time, Pakshadhara Mishra was the head of Nyaya Shastra in the university of Mithila. Vasudeva Sarvabhauma studied Nyaya Shastra there. After completion of his studies, he appeared in a difficult examination of the university known as Shalaka Pariksha. In the examination of Shalaka Pariksha, one by one he explained one hundred leaves of the manuscripts presented to him. His teacher became very pleased with him, so he was honoured with the title "Sarvabhauma" In the university of Mithila, no one was allowed to take the copy of the manuscripts of the university to outside. When Vasudeva Sarvabhauma came to know the strict rule of the university, he pledged to memorize the manuscript of the text Tattavachintamani and the metrical portions of the Nyaya Kushmanjali. After memorizing them, he went to Kashi. There he studied the philosophy of Vedanta.

== Establishment of academy at Nadia ==
Vasudeva Sarvabhauma return to his home town Nadia in the beginning of 15th century CE after completing the study of the Vedanta philosophy at Kashi. In those days Nadia was emerging as a centre of Sanskrit learning. But study of the higher subjects like Nyaya Shastra was not available there. Then Vasudeva Sarvabhauma established an academy of Logic at Nadia for teaching Nyaya Shastra there. After the establishment of the academy, a large number of students from the Bengal region flocked to his academy for studying Nyaya Shastra. Some prominent disciples of Vasudeva Sarvabhauma were Raghunath Shiromani, Raghunandana, Krishnandana agamavagisha.
