= Vardhamana Upadhyaya =

Scholar of Nyaya Shastra in Mithila

Mahamahopadhyaya Vardhamana Upadhyaya
- वर्धमान उपाध्याय

Court of King Bhairavasimha in Mithila

Personal life
- Born: Vardhamana
- Parent: Gangesha Upadhyaya (father)
- Era: 13th - 14th century CE
- Region: Mithila
- Main interest(s): Nyaya and Vaisheshika Shastra
- Education: Ancient Mithila University
- Known for: Dandaviveka
- Other name: Vardhamana Mahopadhyaya
- Occupation: Judge

Religious life
- Religion: Hinduism
- Jurisprudence: Dandaviveka
- Creed: Sanskrit and Vedic learning
- Profession: Philosopher and teacher

Religious career
- Post: Naiyayika

Vardhamana Upadhyaya (Sanskrit: वर्धमान उपाध्याय, Romanised: Vardhamāna Upādhyāya) was an Indian philosopher from the Mithila region of the Indian subcontinent. He was an eminent Acharya of Nyaya Shastra and successor of Gangesha Upadhyaya in Mithila. He was an important teacher in the tradition of Sanskrit and Vedic learning in Mithila. He wrote several Sanskrit texts and commentaries in the Vedic tradition of India. He was appointed as the judge at the court of King Bhairavasimha in Mithila. He is known for his text Dandaviveka on criminal law. He is also called as Vardhamana Mahopadhyaya or Vardhamana Mahamahopadhyaya.

== Early life ==
Vardhamana was born in a Maithil Brahmin family in Mithila. He was the son of the prominent philosopher Gangesha Upadhyaya. His elder brother name was Gandaka Mishra.

== Education ==
Vardhamana studied Indian philosophy under the guidance of Shankara Mishra and Vachaspati Mishra. The names of the two teachers are mentioned in his text Dandaviveka.
