= Tyaunth Garh =

Hindu tirtha in Mithila

Tyauth Garh
- त्यौंथ गढ़

Religion
- Affiliation: Hinduism
- District: Madhubani district
- Deity: Dakshin Mahakali
- Festival: Kali Puja

Location
- Location: Tyauth Village, Mithila region
- State: Bihar
- Country: India

Tyauth Garh (Maithili: त्यौंथ गढ़) is an ancient and legendary place in the Mithila region of Bihar in India. It is located at Tyauth village of the Benipatti block in the Madhubani district of Bihar. According to legend, Goddess Dakshin Mahakali is seated in the Tyauth Garh. It is the seat of Tantra Vidya. Devotees from different parts of India and Nepal come to here to attain perfection in Tantra Vidya. In the campus of the Tyauth Garh, there is a grand Mahakali Mandir. The Hawan ritual in the temple is performed with the wood brought from cremation ground.

== Description ==
The campus of the Tyauth Garh is a dih. It is spread over one acre of land. The temple complex is tortoise shaped.
