= Shadyantra Pariksha =

Examination System in the ancient university of Mithila

- Type: Examination
- Skills tested: Logic and Argument
- Offered: Honour of Upadhyaya, Mahopadhya and Mahamahopadhyaya
- Regions: Mithila region
- Languages: Sanskrit
- Annual number of test takers: Public
- Prerequisites: Well versed in every types of arguments and questions in any subject
- Examination System of ancient Mithila

Shadyantra Pariksha (Sanskrit: षड्यंत्र परीक्षा) (Note: Ganganath Jha mentions it as 'सरयन्त्र' in Kavi Rahasya.) was a higher examination system in ancient Mithila for testing knowledge of the scholars in the region. It was more tough level of examination than the Shalaka Pariksha.

== Etymology ==
The literal meaning of Shadyantra is conspiracy. It refers to a secret planning by a group or public to defeat. And Pariksha means test or examination. Therefore, the literal meaning of Shadyantra Pariksha is a secret planning to defeat a candidate in test, examination or Shastrartha.

== Background ==
In early Mithila, scholars were examined by different types of examinations. During King Janaka's reign, Shastrarthas were organised at the royal court. The scholars participating in the Shastrarthas had to win the debates among the scholars to prove their scholarship. In the later period examination like Shalaka and Shadyantra Pariksha were introduced to examine the scholarship of the candidate scholars. Shadyantra Pariksha was more tough and higher level of examination than the Shalaka Pariksha. The candidates who were able to qualify the examination were awarded different types of Upadhis like Upadhyaya, Mahopadhya and Mahamahopadhya according to the level of knowledge of the scholars.

== Description ==
It is said that to combat with Buddhist scholars sophistry, the Vedic scholars of Mithila had done very hard work in the protection of Sanatana Dharma. They had to be prepared to answer every types of arguments and questions. In this process a new system of Shastrartha developed in Mithila, called as Shadyantra Pariksha. In this examination any one could ask questions on any subject to the candidate scholars and the candidate scholars had to answer the questions for passing the examination. Gokul Nath Upadhyaya was one of the notable scholars of Nyaya Shastra in Mithila who passed this examination, and was the last pandit who had offered to appear for it. The tradition of holding this examination seems to have ended in the 18th century.
