= Nyayasara =

Treatise of Nyaya school

- न्यायसार

Information
- Religion: Hinduism
- Author: Bhasarvajna
- Language: Sanskrit
- Period: 10th century CE
- A treatise in the Nyaya school of thought

Nyayasara (Sanskrit: न्यायसार, Romanised: Nyāyasāra) is an ancient treatise in the Nyaya school of thought in the Indian philosophy. It was authored by the Indian philosopher Bhasarvajna during the period of 10th century CE in the Indian subcontinent. The original text of Nyayasara was written in the language of the Sanskrit literature.

== Etymology ==
Nyayasara is a compound Sanskrit word having two terms Nyaya and Saara. The term Nyaya is the name of the school of logic in the Indian philosophy and the second term Saara translates as summary or essence. Thus the literal meaning of the compound term Nyayasara is "The Essence of Logic".

== Description ==
Nyayasara is an important treatise in the tradition of Nyaya school of Indian philosophy authored by the eminent Naiyayika Bhāsarvajña. It was written during the period of the 10th century CE. In the text Nyayasara, Bhasarvajna attempted to reduce the sixteen categories of the original Nyaya Sutras of Akshapada Gautama, into one. Similarly, the author had considered only three pramāṇas for the valid sources of knowledge. They are pratyakṣa, anumāna and śabda. According to the text Nyayasara, the pramāṇa which is the means of correct knowledge, should be free from any doubt and error.

Later the author Bhasarvajna also wrote a commentary on his own treatise Nyayasara. The commentary is known as Nyayabhushana.
