= Viratpur =

Village in Mithila region

Viratpur Biratpur
- Village
- Viratpur
- Interactive map of Viratpur
- Coordinates: 26.5156862°N 86.0196407°E
- Country: India
- State: Bihar
- Region: Mithila
- District: Madhubani
- Block: Basopatti
- Founder: King Virat
- Named for: King Virat
- Gram Panchayat: Panchayat Samiti

Government
  - Type: Mukhiya
  - Body: Arghawa Panchayat
- Demonym: Maithil

Language
  - Official: Hindi

Local language
  - Mother language: Maithili

Viratpur also known as Biratpur is a village of the Madhubani district in the Mithila region of Bihar in India. It is in the territory of the Basopatti block in the Madhubani district. The local language of the village is Maithili. A river known as Bachhraja flows through the western part of the village. There is ruins of an ancient fort known as Birautpur (Viratpur) Garh.

Viratpur is the village of the Arghawa Gram Panchayat in the Basopatti block.
