= Athri =

Athri Athri Bazar
- Village
- Nickname: Athri Chowk
- Location in Bihar, India Athri (India)
- Coordinates: 26.4296°N 85.4564°E
- Country: India
- State: Bihar
- District: Sitamarhi

Government
  - Type: Panchayat
  - Body: Mukhiya

Language
  - Official: Maithili, Hindi, Urdu, Bhojpuri, Bajjika
- Time zone: UTC+5:30 (IST)
- PIN: 843311
- Area code: 06226
- ISO 3166 code: IN-BR
- Lok Sabha: Sitamarhi
- Vidhan Sabha: Runnisaidpur

Athri (Known as Athari) is a village located in Runni Saidpur block, Sitamarhi district, Bihar, India. It is situated on the bank of the Lakhandei River. In the ancient period, the village was the seat of learning Atharvaveda in Mithila.

== Origin of the name ==
The name of the village is derived from Atharva Veda.

== Geography ==
Athari is also a Panchayat along with the village. It is managed by Gram panchayat Athri.

== Transport ==
The nearest railway junction is Muzaffarpur Junction railway station. With the start of the railway line between Muzaffapur and Sitamadhi, the nearest railway station has become Runni Saidpur, which is about 5 kilometers away.

The nearest airport is Jay Prakash Narayan Airport, Patna at a distance of over 100 km.
