= Pakshadhara Mishra =

Scholar and Philosopher from Mithila

- Born: Mithila
- Occupation: Philosopher Professor

Philosophical work
- Region: Mithila region
- School: Nyaya School of Indian Philosophy
- Notable students: Vasudeva Sarvabhauma, Raghunatha Siromani
- Main interests: Nyaya Shastra

Pakshadhara Mishra (also known by the alias Jayadeva) was a 15th-century Indian philosopher from the Mithila region and the founder of the Nyaya Shastra sampradaya in the tradition of Gaṅgeśa. He was a practitioner of the Nyaya Shashtra during the 15th century CE. He was a member at the court of King Bhairava Singh of the Oiniwar Dynasty in Mithila. Notable pupils of his pupils include Vasudeva Sarvabhauma and Raghunatha Siromani.

Among his most notable works is the Aloka which superseded all previous commentaries on the Tattvachintamani. The Aloka itself has been confidently dated to some time between 1465-75 A.D.

== Etymology ==
It is said that he once obtained victory in a debate that lasted a fortnight (Paksha), and after that he was referred to as Pakshadhara Mishra.

== Early life ==
Pakshadhara Mishra was born in a Maithil Brahmin family in the Mithila region of the Indian subcontinent. His father name was Vaṭeśvara Mahamahopadhyaya. He belonged to the Sarisav Pahi village of the Madhubani district in Bihar, India.

== Academy of Pakshadhara Mishra ==
The academy of Pakshadhara Mishra was a famous centre of learning Nyaya Shastra. It was located at Bhaur village in the Madhubani district of Bihar, India. It is nearby to his native village Sarisav Pahi. The eminent Naiyayikas Vasudeva Sarvabhauma and Raghunatha Shiromani studied Nyaya Shastra at the academy of Pakshadhara Mishra.

== Literary works ==
Pakshadhara Mishra wrote a text known as the Tattvanirṇaya. He also wrote the texts Dravya Padartha and Lilavati Viveka. Similarly, he also authored a version of the text Vishnu Purana at Jamsam which was located on the west side of the disappeared city Amravati in Mithila. It is still preserved at the library of the Patna Research Society.
