= Basopatti =

Town in Mithila region

Basopatti बासोपट्टी
- Town
- Basopatti
- Interactive map of Basopatti
- Coordinates (Basopatti block office): 26.5633144°N 86.0005246°E
- Country: India
- State: Bihar
- Region: Mithila
- District: Madhubani
- Block: Basopatti

Population (2011)
  - Town: 173,499
  - Urban: 24,424
  - Rural: 149,075
- Demonym: Maithil

Languages
  - Official: Mother language: Hindi; Maithili

Basopatti (Maithili: बासोपट्टी) is a semi urban town in the Madhubani district of the Mithila region in the Bihar state of India. It is also the headquarter of the eponymous named block in the district The local language of the town is Maithili. Apart from the mother language Maithili, people in the town also speak Hindi.

== Demographics ==
According to the population census 2011, the total population of the entire Basopatti block is 1,73,499 whereas the population of the town is 24,424.
