= Gyanshila (Mithila) =

Descriptive epithet name of Mithila

- Romanization: Jñānaśilam
- Language: Sanskrit

Origin
- Origin: Brihadvishnupurana
- Meaning: Home of Knowledge
- Region of origin: Mithila region

Other names
- Nickname: Jnanakshetram
- Names of Mithila

Gyanshila (romanised: Jñānaśilam) also called as Jnanakshetram is one of the various names of Mithila region in Brihadvishnupurana. This name is a descriptive epithet of the region.

== Etymology ==
Gyanshila is a composite Sanskrit word made by the composition of words Gyan and Shila. Gyan means knowledge and Shila means place. Similarly Jnanakshetram is also the composite Sanskrit word made by the composition of words Jnana and Kshetram. Jnana means knowledge and Kshetram means area. The meaning of the both words Gyanshila and Jnanakshetram is the place or area where knowledge is acquired.

== Description ==
According to Brihadvishnupurana, there are twelve names of the Mithila region. Apart from the name Mithila, its twelve names are "Tirabhukti, Videha, Nemikanan, Gyanshila, Kripapith, Swarnlalangalpadhati, Janki Janmabhumi, Nirapeksha, Vikalmasa, Ramanand Kuti, Vishwabhamini and Nityanangla". Apart from these names some books also mentioned the name Jnanakshetram or Jñānaśilam instead of Gyanshila.

In Ramayana, the court of King Janaka attracted scholars from different parts of the Indian Subcontinent. The court of Janaka was the center of discussion of knowledge between the scholars. The Brihadaranyaka Upanishad gives the account of the Shastrarthas organized by the King Janaka at his court. In these Shastrarthas there was exchange of knowledge among the scholars. The translation of Gyanshila or Jnanakshetram is the home of knowledge. Thus the Gyanshila or Jnanakshetram name of Mithila signifies a descriptive epithet of the region.
