= Raghunatha Shiromani =

Indian philosopher and logician (1477–1547)

- Born: 1477; Nabadwip, Nadia district, Bengal Sultanate (present-day West Bengal, India)
- Died: 1547 (aged 69–70); Nabadwip, Bengal Sultanate (present-day West Bengal, India)
- Occupations: Philosopher and logician Head of the Ancient Mithila University

Education
- Education: Ancient Mithila University

Philosophical work
- Era: 13th century - 14th century
- School: Nyaya School of Indian Philosophy
- Institutions: The Navya Nyāya school
- Notable works: Navya Nyaya School of Indian Philosophy

Raghunatha Shiromani (Bengali: রঘুনাথ শিরোমণি, IAST: Raghunātha Śiromaṇi) (c. 1477–1547) was an Indian philosopher and logician. He was the head ( The Chancellor ) of the Ancient Mithila University also known as Mithila Vidyapeeth. He was born in a brahmin family at Nabadwip, in the Bengal Sultanate (present-day Nadia district of West Bengal state). He was the grandson of Śulapāṇi (c. 14th century CE), a noted writer on Smṛti from his mother's side. He was a pupil of Vāsudeva Sārvabhauma. He brought the new school of Nyaya, Navya Nyāya, representing the final development of Indian formal logic, to its zenith of analytic power.

Raghunatha's analysis of relations revealed the true nature of number, inseparable from the abstraction of natural phenomena, and his studies of metaphysics dealt with the negation or nonexistence of a complex reality. His most famous work in logic was the Tattvacintāmaṇidīdhiti, a commentary on the Tattvacintāmaṇi of Gangeśa Upādhyāya, founder of the Navya Nyāya school.
