= Kariyan =

Coordinates: 25°51′24″N 86°00′39″E

Kariyan or Karian is a village and a panchayat in Samastipur district in the Indian state of Bihar.

== Location ==
About 12-km northeast of the Rosera ghat railway station of Northeastern Railways the modern village of Karian is situated on a mound, 20-ft high from the surrounding ground level and about 96 acres in area. Local traditions associate this village to be the birthplace of Udayanacharya, a Maithil Brahmin and great philosopher of ancient times who is also supposed to be an incarnation of Lord Vishnu. Extensive excavations have revealed at this village antiques of as back as of 2nd century B.C. and afterwards from 6th century AD to post 1200 A.D.This village is the birthplace of philosopher and scholar Udayana alias Udyanacharya

This village is called the karmbhoomi of famous udyana who was a great philosopher and "shastarthi " in the time of Kumarilbhatta. It is said that both of udayanacharya and kumarilbhatta stop the expansion of Buddhism's in eastern India. Udayanaachaarya Udayanacharya or Udayakara, a Brahmana logician of Mithila wrote a sub-gloss on Vachaspati's work called the Nyaya-vaartika-taatparya-tiikaa-parishuddhi. He wrote several other works such as the Kusumanjali, Atma-tattva-viveka, Kiranaavali and Nyaya-parishishhta (also called Bodha siddhi or Bodha shuddhi). UdayanAchArya (a "tArkika-n") and Kumarilabhatta (a "mImAmsaka-n"). To the "mImAmsakA-s" the Buddhist's summary rejection of Vedic ritualismwas the proverbial red rag waved under the nose of a raging bull !Kumarilabhatta, it can be seen, has written copiously criticising the Buddhist's distaste for Vedic ritualism. He and UdayanAchArya were chiefly responsible for the failure of Buddhism to acquire a large following in the country. (Scholars mention here the texts of "tarkapAdam" ofKumarilabhatta and the "bauddhadhikAram" by UdayanAchAryA). Late Sanaknandanacharya was another baishnav saint belongs to Village Kariyan. A famous maithili poet Late Kali Kant Jha Buch was born at Kariyan. He wrote a huge nos songs, poems & navgeet in maithili literature. A poetry collection named " Kalanidhi" was composed after his death.

== Demographics ==
According to census 2001, The total population of the village is 18,086. The literacy rate is 41%. The female literacy rate is 26.87%. The male literacy rate is 54.67%

Parameters	Total (Rural)	Male	Female
Populations	18,086	9,134	8,952
Population Below 6 years	4,076	2,341	2,029
Literate	5,744	3,884	1,860
Schedule Castes	4,681	2,341	2,340

== How to reach ==
Nearest railway station Rosera is 12 km south. Kariyan is well connected by road, It is 12 km north of Rosera market and 12 km south from Baheri (Rosera-Shivajinagar-Baheri path) . Kariyan can also reached by 28 km form the district headquarters Samastipur and one can reach 35 km from Darbhanga.

== Living ==
Most of the people of village are farmers.

Agriculture is main source of living for the most people of village .

There are some people in government services. Many from the youth are outside the village because of their education and profession. People of all caste and creed live here in harmony .

The village features infrastructure and amenities comparable to those of a small city, including paved roads, electricity, telecommunication and telephone networks, educational institutions, and healthcare facilities.

== Places to see ==
Famous Kariyan Deeha

Udyanchanrya temple and library.

Ancient Bhagwati temple ( Jagatdhaatree Mandir ) on the Bank Of Badi Pokhar

Siya Jha Sweets (Peda). Badi Pokhar Maa Jagatdhaatree Mandir, Shiv Mandir near navki pokhar, Durga Sthan, Mahavir Sthan etc.
