= Shalaka Pariksha =

Examination system for graduates in ancient university of Mithila

- Type: Examination
- Skills tested: Knowledge of Manuscripts
- Purpose: Graduation Degree
- Regions: Mithila
- Languages: Sanskrit
- Prerequisites: Well versed in manuscripts
- Examination System for Graduation degree in the ancient Indian Subcontinent

Shalaka Pariksha (Sanskrit: शलाका परीक्षा, Romanised: Śalākāparīkṣā) was an examination system for graduation degree in ancient Mithila.

== Etymology ==
Śalākāparīkṣā is a compound Sanskrit word made of two terms Shalaka and Pariksha. Shalaka means needle or pin and Pariksha means examination.

== Description ==
It is said that the graduation examination system, called the Shalaka Pariksha, in ancient Mithila was very strict. In this examination a needle was pierced in manuscripts, and the student had to explain the page where the needle was stopped. It was done as that the student was expected to be well versed and prepared thorough with the entirety of the texts. The examination system was reflourished during the 13th century CE in Mithila. In terms of difficulty, it was at the same level as the entrance tests for Nalanda and Vikramshila, which were conducted by their Dvara Pandits.

== Modern Era ==
In the modern era, the examination system of Shalaka Pariksha has been revived by some traditional education institutions in India. In recent years Central Sanskrit University has started Shalaka Pariksha in seven subjects. These subjects are literature, grammar, Nyaya Shastra, Theory of Astrology, Vedanta, History of Puranas and Mimansa Shastra.

In 2023, Ramanreti Ashram at Mahavan in Mathura district conducted All India Sanskrit Bharati Shalaka Pariksha in nine subjects at its campus. In this examination 286 students from different parts of the country were registered but only 125 students took part in the examination. In 2024, Shalaka Pariksha was organised jointly by Sanskrit Bharati Uttar Pradesh Trust and Guru Karshni Vidya Bhavan Kashi on 25th February at Shree Karshni Ashram, Ramanreti Mahavan. The present National Convener of All India Sanskrit Shalaka Pariksha is Professor Dr Shivshankar Mishra of Shri Lal Bahadur Shastri National Sanskrit University.
