= Bhaur Gram =

Village in Bihar

Bhaur Bhawra or Bhawr
- Village
- Bhaur Gram Panchyat
- Interactive map of Bhaur
- Coordinates: 26.2697669°N 86.1483083°E
- Country: India
- State: Bihar
- Region: Mithila
- District: Madhubani district
- Block: Pandaul

Population (2011)
  - Total: 8,828
- Demonym: Maithil

Languages
  - Official: Mother language: Hindi; Maithili language
- Early capital of the Khandawala Dynasty in the historical Tirhut Sarkar.

Bhaur Gram is a historical village in the Madhubani district of the Mithila region in Bihar, India. It is the birthplace of the founder King Mahesha Thakura of the Khandwala Dynasty in Mithila. The King Mahesha Thakura established the first capital of his kingdom at Bhaur Gram. It is one of the major villages in the Mithila region for the residence of the Maithil Brahmins.

== History ==
The historian Makhan Jha in his book "Anthropology of Ancient Hindu Kingdoms" mentioned that Pandit Shripati Thakur, the grandfather of the King Mahesha Thakura received some favours from the Bharajitiya Rajputs of Mithila. Then Shripati Thakur settled at the village of Bhaur in Mithila. The village of Bhaur is the moolgram of the Kharore Bhaur clan in the Maithil Brahmins of the Shandilya Gotra.

== Geography ==
Bhaur village is at a distance of 17 miles from the city of Darbhanga in North-East direction. Similarly it is at a distance of 7.5 miles in the South-East direction from the headquarter of the Madhubani district.

== Demographics ==
As of 2011, the number of families residing in this village is 1906. The total population of the village is 8828, of which 4561 are male while 4267 are females. The sex ratio of Bhaur village is 936 females to 1000 males on average. Among children, this ratio is on average 946 females to every 1000 males. In 2011, the literacy rate of Bhaur village was 52.46%, with literacy among males at 62.44% and 41.77% among females.
