= Bhasarvajna =

Indian philosopher

Ācārya Bhāsarvajña
- भासर्वज्ञ

Personal life
- Era: 10th century CE
- Region: Kashmir
- Main interest(s): Nyāya Śāstra, Indian philosophy
- Notable work(s): Nyāyasāra, Nyāyabhūṣaṇa, Gaṇakārikā, Ratnaṭīkā
- Known for: Author of Nyāya and Pāśupata works

Religious life
- Religion: Hinduism

Bhāsarvajña (Sanskrit: भासर्वज्ञ) was an Indian philosopher active in the 10th century CE. He is known primarily as a representative of the classical Nyāya school of Indian philosophy, and as the author of the Nyāyasāra.

== Life and background ==
Little is known about Bhāsarvajña’s life. He is often associated with the Kashmir region in later scholarship.

== Works ==
In addition to the Nyāyasāra, Bhāsarvajña is traditionally credited with the Nyāyabhūṣaṇa, an extensive auto-commentary on the Nyāyasāra that engages critically with rival epistemological positions.

Bhāsarvajña is also associated with the Gaṇakārikā, a concise handbook of Pāśupata Śaiva doctrine. This association derives primarily from a manuscript colophon edited by C. D. Dalal, who attributed both the Gaṇakārikā and its commentary, the Ratnaṭīkā, to Bhāsarvajña on the basis of a Patan manuscript tradition. The attribution has been disputed in later scholarship, with several scholars arguing instead that Bhāsarvajña authored only the Ratnaṭīkā, the commentary on the Gaṇakārikā.

While the Nyāyasāra is available in many editions, having been the subject of over a dozen commentaries, the Nyāyabhūṣaṇa is available in only one printed edition based on a single manuscript.
