= Udayana =

Indian Hindu philosopher and logician (c.975–1050)

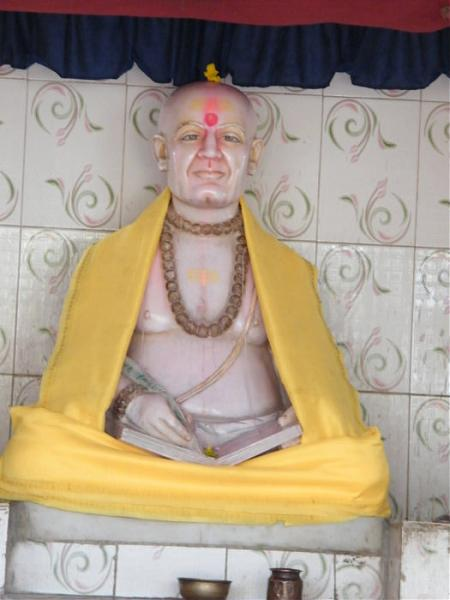
- Udayanacharya Statue at Udayanacharya Mandir in Kariyan village of Dhanusha district in the Mithila region

Personal life
- Born: 975 A.D. Dhanusha Mithila (modern-day Nepal)
- Died: 1050 A.D.
- Main interest: Nyaya Shastra
- Notable idea: Existence of God by Logic
- Notable work: Nyayakusumanjali
- Occupation: Philosopher and Teacher

Religious life
- Religion: Hinduism
- Creed: Nyaya School of Indian Philosophy

Udayana, (Devanagari: उदयन) also known as Udayanācārya (Udyanacharya, or Master Udayana), (circa 975 - 1050 CE) was an Indian philosopher and logician of the tenth century of the Nyaya school who attempted to devise a rational theology to prove the existence of God using logic and counter the attack on the existence of God at the hands of Buddhist philosophers such as Dharmakīrti, Jñānaśrī and against the Indian school of materialism (Chārvaka). He is considered to be the most important philosopher of the Nyāya tradition.

He worked to reconcile the views held by the two major schools of logic (Nyaya and Vaisheshika). This became the root of the Navya-Nyāya ("New Nyāya") school of the thirteenth century, established by the Gangesha Upadhyaya school of "right" reasoning, which is still recognized and followed in some regions of India today. He lived in Kariyan village in Mithila, near present-day Samastipur, Bihar state, India.

Udayana wrote a sub-gloss on Vachaspati Misra's work called the Nyaya-vaartika-taatparya-tiikaa-parishuddhi. He wrote several other works such as the Kusumanjali, Atma-tattva-viveka, Kiranaavali and Nyaya-parishishhta (also called Bodha siddhi or Bodha shuddhi).

He is given credit by Naiyāyikas for having demolished in a final fashion the claims of the Buddhist logicians. All his known works are thought to have been preserved, attesting to the importance given to him in Indian philosophy.

== Life ==
It is accepted by most scholars now that he was from Mithila, Bihar. In the Nyāya-Vaiśeṣika school itself, to which he belongs, he occupies a singular position of authority and renown. Flourishing at the period of transition from the Older Nyāya to the New (Navya-Nyāya), he shines as an unrivalled master of the former and an inspiring herald of the latter. For example, Gaṇgeśa Upādhyāya, the 14th century Indian philosopher and mathematician who established the Navya-Nyāya school refers to Udayana as "Acāryaḥ" (lit. Master/Teacher). D. C. Bhattacharya observes: "From the 12th century onwards he [= Udayana] was looked upon as the greatest exponent of the Nyāya-Vaiśeṣika doctrines and was the greatest target of all scholars of the opposing camps".

One Indian writer of the 14th century, Mādhavacharya, the author of the Sarvadarsanasamgraha, speaks of him not only as "one whose fame had spread everywhere" (viśvavikhyātakīrtih), but also as "one who has seen the opposite shore of the ocean of the principles of logic" (nyāyanayapārāvārapāradṛk), an epithet which shows his fame as a logician.

The controversy about Udayana's lifetime seemed to have been settled by the discovery of the Lakṣaṇāvalī, the concluding verse of which states that it was written in Saka era 906 (984—985 CE). Hence, he was active as a philosopher from the late 10th century to the beginning of the 11th century.

== Philosophy ==
Udayana's work represents a synthesis of ontological and epistemological theories, combining the Vaisheshika system of categories (padarthas) with the Nyaya doctrine of pramanas (means of knowledge).

=== Ontological Categories ===
Udayana's philosophy is heavily influenced by the Vaisesika school, which organizes the world into several ontological categories. These include: Substance (Dravya): The foundational entities that support qualities and actions. Quality (Guna): Attributes that are in substances. Action (Karma): The motion or activity of substances. Generality (Samanya): The common essence shared by multiple instances of a substance. Particularity (Vishesha): The unique characteristics that differentiate individual instances. Inherence (Samavaya): The relation that binds qualities and actions to substances. Non-existence (Abhava): The recognition of absence or non-being as a category.

=== Theory of Knowledge (Pramana) ===
Udayana's integration of the Nyaya theory of pramanas with the Vaisesika ontology was crucial. The Nyaya school identifies four primary pramanas: Perception (Pratyaksha): Direct sensory experience. Inference (Anumana): Deductive reasoning from observed facts. Comparison (Upamana): Knowledge gained through analogy. Testimony (Shabda): Reliance on authoritative verbal communication.

=== Definitional Method (Lakshana) ===
Udayana was particularly concerned with the formulation of precise definitions (Lakshana) to delineate each category within his system. He aimed to establish clear boundaries for each concept, which he believed was essential for maintaining logical consistency and clarity in philosophical discourse.

=== Philosophy as a Logical Discipline ===
Udayana distinguished philosophy from spiritual or religious practices by emphasizing its foundation in logical reasoning and epistemology. This approach contrasts with other Indian philosophical traditions that often intertwine metaphysical inquiries with spiritual goals like moksha (liberation).

Udayana's synthesis represents a significant moment in the history of Indian philosophy, marking the convergence of two major schools into a unified system that would dominate Indian philosophical discourse for centuries. His work is characterized by a rigorous analytical approach, emphasizing the importance of clear conceptual distinctions and logical analysis in the pursuit of truth.

=== Nyayakusumanjali and the existence of God ===
Udayana's Nyayakusumanjali gave the following nine arguments to prove the existence of a creative God.

- Kāryāt (lit. "from effect"): The world is an effect, all effects have efficient cause, hence the world must have an efficient cause. That efficient cause is God.
- Āyojanāt (lit., from combination): Atoms are inactive. To form a substance, they must combine. To combine, they must move. Nothing moves without intelligence and a source of motion. Since we perceive substance, some intelligent source must have moved the inactive atoms. That intelligent source is God.
- Dhŗtyādéḥ (lit., from support): Something sustains this world. Something destroys this world. Unintelligent Adrsta (unseen principles of nature) cannot do this. We must infer that something intelligent is behind it. That is God.
- Padāt (lit., from word): Each word has meaning and represents an object. This representational power of words has a cause. That cause is God.
- Pratyayataḥ (lit, from faith): Vedas are infallible. Human beings are fallible. Infallible Vedas cannot have been authored by fallible human beings. Someone authored the infallible Vedas. That author is God.
- Shrutéḥ (lit., from scriptures): The infallible Vedas testify to the existence of God. Thus God exists.
- Vākyāt (lit., from precepts): Vedas deal with moral laws, the rights and the wrongs. These are divine. Divine injunctions and prohibitions can only come from a divine creator of laws. That divine creator is God.
- Samkhyāviśeşāt (lit., from the specialty of numbers): By rules of perception, only the number "one" can ever be directly perceived. All numbers other than one are inferences and concepts created by consciousness. When man is born, his mind is incapable of inferences and concepts. He develops consciousness as he develops. The consciousness development is self-evident and proven because of man's ability with perfect numerical conception. This ability to conceive numerically perfect concepts must depend on something. That something is divine consciousness. So God must exist.
- Adŗşţāt (lit., from the unforeseen): Everybody reaps the fruits of his own actions. Merits and demerits accrue from his own actions. An unseen power keeps a balance sheet of the merit and demerit. But since this unseen power is unintelligent, it needs intelligent guidance to work. That intelligent guide is God.

== Other works by Udayana ==
Seven works have been ascribed to Udayana. The following are the titles of the works in the chronological order in which they are believed to have been composed.

- Lakṣaṇamālā: This is a short manual giving very clear definitions and the main divisions of the sixteen categories of the Nyaya and the six categories of the Vaisesika system.
- Lakṣaṇāvalī: This work resembles the Laksanamala in form, purpose and method of treatment. It differs from the latter in that it deals exclusively with the Vaisesika categories and their subdivisions.
- Atmatattvaviveka: This is an independent work in four chapters of varying lengths. Each of these chapters is devoted to refute different theories put forward to establish the non-existence of a permanent soul (atma) such as conceived by the Nyäya-Vaisesikas.
- Nyāyakusumañjali: (See outline above)
- Nyāyapariṣista: This deals exclusively with the Jatis and Nigrahasthanas, which form the subject matter of the fifth chapter of the Nyayasutras.
- Nyāyavarttikatātparyapariśuddhi: This is an elaborate commentary on the Nyäyavarttikatätparyatika of Vacaspatimisra.
- Kiraṇāvalī: This is a commentary on the Padarthadharmasamgraha of Prasastapada.
