= Navya-Nyāya =

View, system, or school of Indian logic and philosophy, founded in the 13th century

The Navya-Nyāya or Neo-Logical school of Indian logic and Indian philosophy was founded in the 13th century by the philosopher Gaṅgeśa of Mithila and continued by Raghunatha Shiromani of Nabadwip in Bengal. It was a development of the classical Nyāya school. Other influences on Navya-Nyāya were the work of earlier philosophers Vācaspati Miśra (900–980 CE) and Udayana (late 10th century). It remained active in India through to the 18th century.

Gangeśa's book Tattvacintāmaṇi "Thought-Jewel of Reality" was written partly in response to Śrīharśa's Khandanakhandakhādya, a defence of Advaita Vedānta, which had offered a set of thorough criticisms of Nyāya theories of thought and language. In his book, Gaṅgeśa both addressed some of those criticisms and, more importantly, critically examined the Nyāya school itself. He held that while Śrīharśa had failed to successfully challenge the Nyāya realist ontology, his and Gaṅgeśa's own criticisms brought out a need to improve and refine the logical and linguistic tools of Nyāya thought, to make them more rigorous and precise.

Tattvacintāmani dealt with all the important aspects of Indian philosophy, logic and especially epistemology, which Gaṅgeśa examined rigorously, developing and improving the Nyāya scheme, and offering examples. The results, especially his analysis of cognition, were taken up and used by other schools.

Navya-Nyāya developed a sophisticated language and conceptual scheme that allowed it to raise, analyze, and solve problems in logic and epistemology. It involves naming each object to be analyzed, identifying a distinguishing characteristic for the named object, and verifying the appropriateness of the defining characteristic using pramanas 'proofs'. It systematized all the Nyāya concepts into four main categories which are (sense-) perception (pratyakşa), inference (anumāna), comparison or similarity (upamāna), and testimony (sound or word; śabda). Great stalwarts like Basudev Sarvabhauma, Raghunatha Shiromani, Jagadish Tarkalankar, Gadadhar Bhattacharya and Mathuranatha Tarkavagisha have contributed further in the development of the subject. Prof John Vattanky has contributed significantly to the modern understanding of Navya-Nyāya.

== See also ==
- Vaisheshika
- Nyaya
- John Vattanky

== Sources and further reading ==
- Bimal Krishna Matilal, The Navya-Nyaya Doctrine of Negation: The Semantics and Ontology of Negative Statements in Navya-Nyaya Philosophy (Harvard University Press, 1968) ISBN 0-674-60650-7
- J. N. Mohanty, Classical Indian Philosophy (Rowman & Littlefield, 2000) ISBN 0-8476-8933-6
- Sarvepalli Radhakrishnan, et al. [edd], History of Philosophy Eastern and Western: Volume One (George Allen & Unwin, 1952)
- Vattanky, John, Nyāyapañcānana B. Viśvanātha, Nyāyapañcānana B. Viśvanātha, and Dinakarabhaṭṭa. Nyāya Philosophy of Language: Analysis, Text, Translation and Interpretation of Upamāna and Śabda Sections of Kārikāvalī, Muktāvalī and Dinakarī. (Delhi: Sri Satguru Publications, 1995)
- Vattanky, John. A System of Indian Logic: The Nyana Theory of Inference. (London : Routledge, 2015)
- Vattanky, John. Development of Nyāya theism. (New Delhi: Intercultural Publications, 1993)
- BHATTACHARYYA, SIBAJIBAN. “GADĀDHARA BHAṬṬĀCĀRYA’S ‘VIṢAYATĀVĀDA.’” Journal of Indian Philosophy 14, no. 2 (1986): 109–93.
- BHATTACHARYYA, SIBAJIBAN. “GADĀDHARA BHAṬṬĀCĀRYA’S ‘VIṢAYATĀVĀDA’ (Continued).” Journal of Indian Philosophy 14, no. 3 (1986): 217–302.
- Bhattacharyya, Sibajiban. Some Features of Navya-Nyāya Logic. Philosophy East and West 24, no. 3 (1974): 329–42.
- Bhattacharyya, Sibajiban. Some Features of the Technical Language of Navya-Nyāya. Philosophy East and West 40, no. 2 (1990): 129–49.
