= Nyayakusumanjali =

10th century treatise by the Indian philosopher Udayana

Cover page of Nyayakusumanjali published by Asiatic Society of Bengal in 1888.

Nyayakusumanjali (A Handful of Flowers of Logic) is a treatise in Sanskrit composed by 10th century CE Indian logician and philosopher Udayana. The work has been described as codification of the Hindu arguments for the existence of God. It has been noted that this treatise is the most elaborate and the most fundamental work of the Nyaya-Vaiseshika school on the Isvara doctrine.

== An outline of Nyaya-kusumanjali ==
In Indian philosophical writings a prakarana refers to a genre of work that may be considered as roughly equivalent to the Western concept of a monograph. Nyayakusumanjali is a treatise belonging to this genre. Since the work consists of verses (known as karikas) interspersed with prose, it can be considered as a work of the genre Misra-prakarana (meaning "mixed-prakarana").

There are seventy-three verses in Nyayakusumanjali. These verses are distributed unevenly in five chapters (called Stabakas, that is, "cluster of blossoms" or "bunch of flowers"). These chapters contain respectively twenty, four, twenty-three, six and twenty verses. These verses form the core of the work, the prose passage that accompanies each being an elaborate explanation of it.

After a few introductory lines, Udayana enumerates five principal arguments which are said to invalidate the existence of Isvara: "With regard to this there are five erroneous opinions (which assert that there exists no Isvara) on the ground that:

1. there is no other-worldly means (of attaining) a world beyond;
2. even without assuming an Isvara the performance of the means of (attaining) the world beyond is possible;
3. there are arguments that make known the non-existence of Isvara;
4. even if Isvara existed, he would not be a source of valid cognition; and
5. there are no arguments that can validly establish his (existence)".

The various chapters of the Nyayakusumanjali deal with and refute these five erroneous opinions in the order in which they have been enunciated. However, some scholars are of the opinion that the first Stabaka refutes the view of the Carvakas, the second the view of the Mimamsakas, the third that of the Buddhists, the fourth that of the Jains and the fifth the view of the Samkhyins. Of the five chapters, the first four chapters have a negative tone in the sense that their main intention is to refute the objections of the different schools against the existence of Isvara. The last chapter has a positive tone in the sense that it tries to produce arguments and proofs for the existence of Isvara.

=== Stabaka 1 ===
The first Stabaka begins with a dedicatory verse and it is followed with a statement regarding the theme dealt with in the book, namely the Supreme Soul. The author then summarises the reason for the logical discussion on Isvara: Despite the fact that Isvara is acknowledged by all philosophical schools and religious sects under some name or other, this study which is to be designated as reflection is made as an act of worship (upäsanä) that comes after the listening to the scriptures (sravanam). Then the five objections against the existence of Isvara are listed.

Udayana lists five arguments for the existence of a supra-mundane means for attaining the other world. There is a supra-mundane cause because of the following reasons:

1. This world is dependent on causes.
2. The stream of causes is beginning-less.
3. There is diversity of effects.
4. There is universal practice of sacrificial rites etc.
5. The experience (of pleasure and pain) is confined to each individual soul.

The discussion of these five arguments forms the subject matter of the first Stabaka.

=== Stabaka 2 ===
In this Stabaka, Udayana tries to refute the argument that the transmission of Dharma or religious duties is possible without an Isvara. Udayana argues that the transmission of Dharma or religious duties is possible, because of the following reasons:

1. Validity of cognition is not intrinsic, but extrinsic.
2. There are creations and dissolutions of the universe.
3. There can be no confidence in the transmission of Dharma by a person other than Isvara.
4. There is no other way of explaining the transmission of Dharma except through Isvara.

The explanation of these four themes forms the content of the second Stabaka.

=== Stabaka 3 ===
Taking one by one the different means of valid cognition admitted by the opponents, Udayana shows in this Stabaka that none of them can disprove the existence of Isvara.

1. Direct perception cannot disprove the existence of Isvara.
2. Inference cannot disprove the existence of Isvara.
3. Comparison cannot disprove the existence of Isvara.
4. Verbal testimony cannot disprove the existence of Isvara.
5. Implication cannot disprove the existence of Isvara.
6. Non-perception cannot disprove the existence or Isvara.

=== Stabaka 4 ===
The major portion of this Stabaka is devoted to the refutation of the Mimamsaka theory that valid cognition must be of an object not previously cognised. Udayana then shows that the cognition of Isvara cannot be said to be invalid even according to the definition of valid cognition given by the opponents.

=== Stabaka 5 ===
Udayana brings forward in this Stabaka a number of proofs to establish the existence of Isvara. The various proofs can be summarized as follows. Isvara's existence is established from:

1. käryatvät: the fact that the earth etc., being effects, presuppose a cause that produces them.
2. ayojanat: the necessity of a conscious agent to impel the atoms to combine themselves and form the universe.
3. dhrteh: the necessity of a supporting agent of the universe preventing it from falling down.
4. samharanat: the necessity of a being endowed with the quality of effort in order to cause the dissolution of the universe into its ultimate components.
5. padat: the fact that at the time of the new creation an instructor is required to teach the living beings the different usages.
6. pratyaydt: the authoritativeness of the Vedic tradition.
7. sruteh: the fact that the Vedic nature of the Veda requires an omniscient author.
8. anvayatah: the fact that the Vedic sentences require a person as author.
9. samkhyävisesat: the necessity of a relating cognition, at the time of the origin of the universe, in order to produce the plural number which in turn causes magnitude in the triads.

== Other works by Udayana ==
Seven works have been ascribed to Udayana. The following are the titles of the works in the chronological order in which they are believed to have been composed.

- Laksanamala: This is a short manual giving very clear definitions and the main divisions of the sixteen categories of the Nyaya and the six categories of the Vaisesika system.
- Laksanavali : This work resembles the Laksanamala in form, purpose and method of treatment. It differs from the latter in that it deals exclusively with the Vaisesika categories and their subdivisions.
- Atmatattvaviveka: This is an independent work in four chapters of varying lengths. Each of these chapters is devoted to refute different theories put forward to establish the non-existence of a permanent soul (atma) such as conceived by the Nyäya-Vaisesikas.
- Nyayakusumanjali: (See outline above)
- Nyayaparisista: This deals exclusively with the Jatis and Nigrahasthanas, which form the subject matter of the fifth chapter of the Nyayasutras.
- Nyayavarttikatatparyaparisuddhi: This is an elaborate commentary on the Nyäyavarttikatätparyatika of Vacaspatimisra.
- Kiranavali: This is a commentary on the Padarthadharmasamgraha of Prasastapada.

== See also ==
- Pramāṇa-samuccaya
- Tattvacintāmaṇi
