= Gaṅgeśa =

14th-century Indian philosopher, logician and mathematician

Gangesha
- गङ्गेश
- Born: Gangesha
- Occupations: Philosopher and logician

Philosophical work
- Region: Mithila region
- School: Nyaya School of Indian Philosophy
- Language: Sanskrit
- Notable works: Navya Nyaya School of Indian Philosophy, Tattvachintāmaṇi
- Notable ideas: New Logic

Gaṅgeśa (Sanskrit: गङ्गेश / Gaṅgeśa ) (first half of the 14th century) was an Indian philosopher, logician and mathematician from the kingdom of Mithila. He established the Navya-Nyāya ("New Logic") school. His Tattvachintāmaṇi (The Jewel of Thought on the Nature of Things), also known as Pramāṇacintāmaṇi (The Jewel of Thought on the Means of Valid Knowledge), is the basic text for all later developments. The logicians of this school were primarily interested in defining their terms and concepts related to non-binary logical categories.

== Life ==
Gaṅgeśa was a native of the Mithila region in modern-day Bihar. He seems to have been born and raised in a village called Chadana however this is no longer identifiable. He later lived in the village of Karion, the same village that fellow philosopher, Udayana came from which is twelve miles southeast of the city of Darbhanga.

Scholars have struggled to find an accurate date for Gaṅgeśa with the most common estimate placing him in the late thirteenth century however recent opinion now places him in the fourteenth century.

== Teachings ==
Gaṅgeśa's work is mainly focused on epistemology although he does rely on ontological systems in his analyses. He inherits his thoughts from his predecessor, Udayana which he incorporates into his Navya-Nyāya system. In his exploration of causal relationships, Gaṅgeśa identifies several categories of possible referents that play a role in understanding causality. These categories are grounded in the relationships between causes and effects, and they include:

Inherence (Samavāya): This refers to the inseparable relationship between a substance and its qualities or actions. For instance, the colour of a pot is inherently related to the pot itself. Non-inherence (Asamavāya): This category involves relationships that are not direct but still play a crucial role in causal connections, such as the colour of threads contributing to the colour of the cloth. Non-existence (Abhāva): Gaṅgeśa also discusses the concept of non-existence as a possible referent in causal relations. Non-existence can refer to the absence of a cause or an effect, which plays a crucial role in understanding why certain effects do not occur.

=== Perception ===
Gaṅgeśa provides a detailed account of perception (pratyakṣa) as a fundamental means of knowledge acquisition. He categorises perception into two types:

Sensory Perception: This type refers to the direct contact between sense organs and external objects, leading to knowledge. Gaṅgeśa's analysis of perception involves understanding how the senses apprehend various qualities of objects, such as colour or sound. Extraordinary Perception (Alaukika Pratyakṣa): While the article touches on Gaṅgeśa's understanding of perception primarily in a sensory context, he also discusses the possibility of extraordinary perception, which occurs in situations that go beyond ordinary sensory experiences.

=== Inference ===
Inference (anumāna) is another critical method of knowledge in Gaṅgeśa's philosophy. Gaṅgeśa defines inference as a process that allows one to draw conclusions based on observed relationships. He distinguishes between two types of inference:

Inference for Oneself (Svārthānumāna): This type of inference is used by an individual to arrive at knowledge independently, based on their own observations and reasoning. Inference for Others (Parārthānumāna): This type of inference is presented in a way that can be communicated to others, providing a logical basis for convincing others of a particular conclusion. Gaṅgeśa's analysis of inference includes an examination of the conditions under which inferences are valid, focusing on the relationship between the observed evidence and the conclusion drawn from it.

=== The Tattvacintāmaṇi ===
The founding text of Navya-Nyaya - is divided into four khaṇḍas (books): Pratyakṣakhaṇḍa (book on perception), Anumānakhaṇḍa (book on inference), Upamānakhaṇḍa (book on comparison) and Śabdakhaṇḍa (book on verbal testimony). The first book opens with a salutation to Shiva.

The Tattvacintāmaṇi (T.C.) is a systematic account of epistemology, logic, and the philosophy of grammar. Other subjects, such as the proofs of God, are treated incidentally.

Gangesa refers to his own teachings as the New Nyaya. This term New Nyaya is not to be understood as implying any great originality in theory on Gangesa's part, but rather originality in method. His work differs from the oldest Nyaya in that he accepts many tenets of the Vaisesika school, and in his arrangement of Nyaya teachings under four headings rather than under the 16 subjects (padartha) of the Old Nyaya.

The newness of Gangesa's method is newness of style and of organization. He is far more precise, more careful to define his terms, than were his predecessors; these virtues of his work are responsible for the fact that perhaps half of Navya-Nyaya literature is based either directly on the T.C. or on a commentary on the T.C.

== See also ==
- Indian philosophers
- Indian mathematicians
- Nyaya
