= Tattvachintamani =

Sanskrit treatise by Gangesa

Tattvachintamani is a treatise in Sanskrit authored by 14th-century CE Indian logician and philosopher Gangesa (fl. c. 1325). The title may be translated into English as "A Thought-jewel of Truth." The treatise is also known as Pramāṇa-chintāmaṇi ("A Thought-jewel of Valid Knowledge").

The treatise introduced a new era in the history of Indian logic. Satis Chandra Vidyabhusana in his authoritative 681-page history of Indian logic divided the millennia long history of Indian logic into three sometimes-overlapping periods: Ancient period (650 BCE–100 CE), Medieval period (100–1200 CE) and Modern period (from 900 CE). He also identified certain standard work as typical representative of each of these periods. Tattvachintamani of Gangesa is the text identified as the standard work of the Modern period in the history of Indian logic, the standard works for the earlier periods being Nyāya Sūtra by Akshapāda Gautama (Ancient period) and Pramāṇa-samuccaya by Dignāga (Medieval period). The fact that Tattvachintāmaṇi was highly popular is attested by the appearance of numerous commentaries that have been produced in the centuries that followed the appearance of the book. It has been estimated that while the original text of Tattvachintāmaṇi has about 300 pages, all the commentaries put together contain about a million (10 lakh) pages.

== Author of Tattvachintāmaṇi ==
Gangesa Upadhyaya, also known as Gangesvara Upadhyaya, a Maithila Brahmin, who flourished during the 12th century CE, is the author of Tattvacintāmaṇi. Gangesa was a native of Mithila, was born in a village named Chadana and lived his later life in a village named Karion on the banks of the river Kamala, twelve miles south-east of Darbhanga. There is a legend to the effect that Gangesa was completely illiterate while he was young and propitiated the goddess Kali on the cremation ground adjacent to his uncle's house, and acquired from her, as a boon, deep erudition in the science of Logic. He belonged to Kashyapa-gotra. It is believed that he had several wives, three sons and a daughter. One of his sons was Vardhamana Upadhyaya who was also a pupil of Gangesa. Varadhamana himself became a great scholar of nyaya and composed a commentary on Tattvacintāmaṇi named Tattvachintāmaṇi-prakasa and also several other works.

== Outline of contents ==
Large sections of the treatise have not yet been translated into English or any other Indian languages. Broadly, Tattva-Chintāmaṇi is divided into four books dealing respectively with perception (pratyakṣha), inference (anumāna), comparison (upamāna) and verbal testimony (śabda). According to Nyaya doctrines, these are the four means for deriving valid knowledge. The following references provide sources where one can find detailed accounts of the contents of Tattva-Chintāmaṇi.

Gangesa begins with a benedictory verse for Shiva.

== Commentaries on Tattva-Chintāmaṇi ==
Tattva-Chintāmaṇi has attracted many commentaries. Vardhamana Mahopadhyaya, a son of Gangesa, has himself written a commentary on Tattva-Chintāmaṇi. The History of Logic gives brief accounts of as many as 48 commentaries.

== Bibliography ==
- Gangesa, Classical Indian philosophy of induction: the Nyāya viewpoint, (Translator: Kisor Kumar Chakrabarti), ISBN 9780739147054, OCLC 665834163
- Gangesa, Tattva-cintā-maṇi, (“Jewel”), translated by Stephen Phillips, Jewel of Reflection on the Truth about Epistemology. 3 volumes, London: Bloomsbury, 2020.
- Satis Chandra Vidyabhusana. A History of Indian Logic. Motilal Banarsidass. pp. 405–453.
- Karl H. Potter, Sibajiban Bhattacharyya (1993). Volume 6 of Encyclopedia of Indian philosophies: Indian philosophical analysis Nyaya-Vaiśesika from Gangeśa to Raghunatha Śiromani. Motilal Banarsidass. pp. 85–311. ISBN 9788120808942.
