= Ubhay Bharati =

Female scholar in Mithila

Vidushi Ubhaya Bharati
- उभय भारती
- Born: Bhatpura village, Mithila region
- Other names: Saraswati, Sharda Devi
- Education: Ancient Mithila University
- Era: 8th Century CE
- Known for: Serving as Umpire of the philosophical debates between Adi Shankaracharya and Mandan Mishra; Defeating Adi Shankaracharya
- Spouse: Mandana Mishra

Ubhaya Bharati was an Indian female scholar and philosopher from the Mithila region in India during the 8th century CE. She was the wife of the Mimansa scholar Mandana Mishra. She served as the umpire for the philosophical debates between the two eminent scholars Mandana Mishra and Adi Shankaracharya.

== Early life ==
Ubhay Bharati was born in a Maithil Brahmin family at Bhatpura village of the Mithila region in India. Her father was a Jyotishacharya. She was taught primary education by her own father in his guidance at home. She excelled in Sanskrit literature at her childhood. Impressed by her erudition, people of the village also referred to her as Saraswati. Her other name was Sharda Devi. According to legend, Ubhay Bharati is believed to be the incarnation of the Goddess Saraswati in Hinduism. In the text Śaṅkaradigvijaya, there is a story that once the Vedic sage Durvaasa was chanting Vedic Mantras but mistakenly his tongue slipped at some phrases of the Vedic mantras during utterance. Then the Goddess Saraswati laughed on his utterance. After that the sage Durvaasa became angry and cursed her to take birth in the form of human being on the earth.

== Later life ==
According to some literary sources, it is said that Ubhay Bharati was Bhaginī (either sister or niece) of Kumarila Bhatta. Mandana Mishra in student life came to Bhatpura village to learn Mimansa Shastra from the eminent teacher Kumarila Bhatta of Mimansa Shastra. In the Bhatpura village, there is historical place called as Kumarila Bhatta Dih, where Mandana Mishra learnt Mimansa Shastra from his Acharya Kumarila Bhatta. After the completion of the education of Mandana Mishra, it is said that Kumarila Bhatta put proposal for marriage of his disciple Mandan Mishra to his Bhaginī Ubhay Bharati. After the agreement on the proposal among Mandana Mishra, Ubhay Bharati and her father, Ubhay Bharati was married to the Mimansa scholar Mandan Mishra from the Mahishi village of the Saharsa district in the Mithila region of Bihar.

== Adi Shankaracharya and Mandan Mishra Shastrartha ==
Adi Shankaracharya was directed by Kumarila Bhatta to visit the hermitage of his disciple Mandan Mishra for a philosophical debate with him to prove and establish his works on Advaita Vedanta. Then Adi Shankaracharya reached at the village Mahishi in the Mithila region where Mandana Mishra was residing. The historical place where Mandana Mishra with his wife Ubhaya Bharati was living is presently known as Mandan Bharati Dham. There Adi Shankaracharya asked Mandana Mishra for a philosophical debate between them. After the agreement from Mandana Mishra for the debate, Ubhaya Bharati was appointed as the Umpire for the philosophical debate by Adi Shankaracharya. It is said that the philosophical debate also called as Shastrartha in Sanskrit literature continued for many days but in last Mandana Mishra was defeated by Adi Shankaracharya.

== Ubhaya Bharati and Adi Shankaracharya Shastrartha ==
It is said that after seeing the defeat of her husband Mandana Mishra, the learned wife Ubhaya Bharati challenged the winner Adi Shankaracharya for debate with her. Then Shastrartha between Ubhaya Bharati and Adi Shankaracharya started. In this second Shastrartha, Ubhay Bharati asked questions on the topics of Kamasastra to the opponent Adi Shankaracharya. Since Adi Shankaracharya was a scholar of Sanyashi tradition and maintained celibacy in his life, he was not aware with the knowledge of Kamasastra. So he was defeated in the Shastrartha by Ubhay Bharati. After defeating Adi Shankaracharya, she was honoured as Vidushi.

According to legend, it is said that after the defeat, Adi Shankaracharya asked for a period of one month with Ubhaya Bharati, so that he would be able to acquire the knowledge of Kamasastra and invite for one more debate with her on the subject. Ubhaya Bharati agreed to with his proposal. After that Adi Shankaracharya went from there.

It is said that by his Yogic power, his soul entered into the dead body of the king of Amaruka. Then he went to the palace of the king and enjoyed with the queen for a month. There he learnt the art of sexual love in the Kamasastra. After learning the art of sexual love in Kamasastra, he returned to the house of Ubhaya Bharati and again invited for the debate. This time, Ubhaya Bharati recognised the power of Adi Shankaracharya, so didn't go for further debate and she accepted Adi Shankaracharya as the greatest scholar on the earth.

According to some scholars, it is said that after accepting Adi Shankaracharya as the greatest scholar, Ubhaya Bharati left her physical body on the earth and went to her original destination Brahmaloka. Her husband Mandana Mishra became the disciple of the Guru Adi Shankaracharya with a new name Sureshvara. In Southern India, Mandana Mishra is recognised by his name Sureshvara.
