= Maharani Sthan =

Common worship place of Goddess Bhagawati in villages of Mithila region

- महारानी स्थान
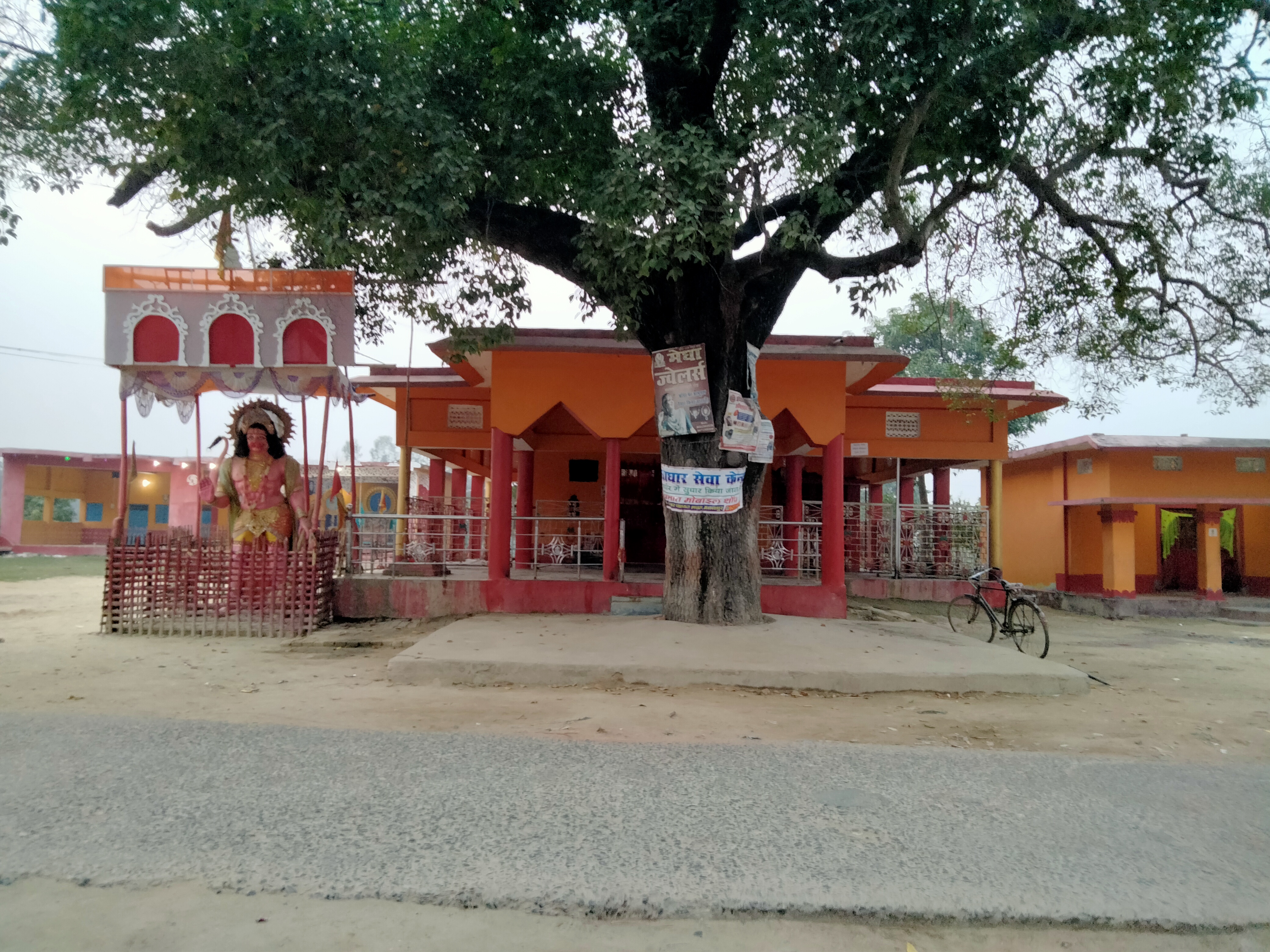
- A temple of Maharani Sthan at Basuki Bihari village in the Mithila region

Religion
- Affiliation: Hinduism
- Deity: Goddess Bhagawati

Location
- Location: Mithila region
- Country: India and Nepal
- Common place for faith and worship to Goddess Bhagawati in the Mithila region

Maharani Sthan (Maithili: महारानी स्थान) also called as Bhagawati Sthan is a common Hindu temple dedicated to Goddess Bhagawati in the villages of the Mithila region in the Indian subcontinent. The Goddess Bhagawati is a lady folk deity and believed to be the incarnation of the Goddess Parvati or Kali. She is considered as the symbol of women power in Hinduism. She is also believed to be the presiding female deity of the villages in the region. She is the Goddess of faith.

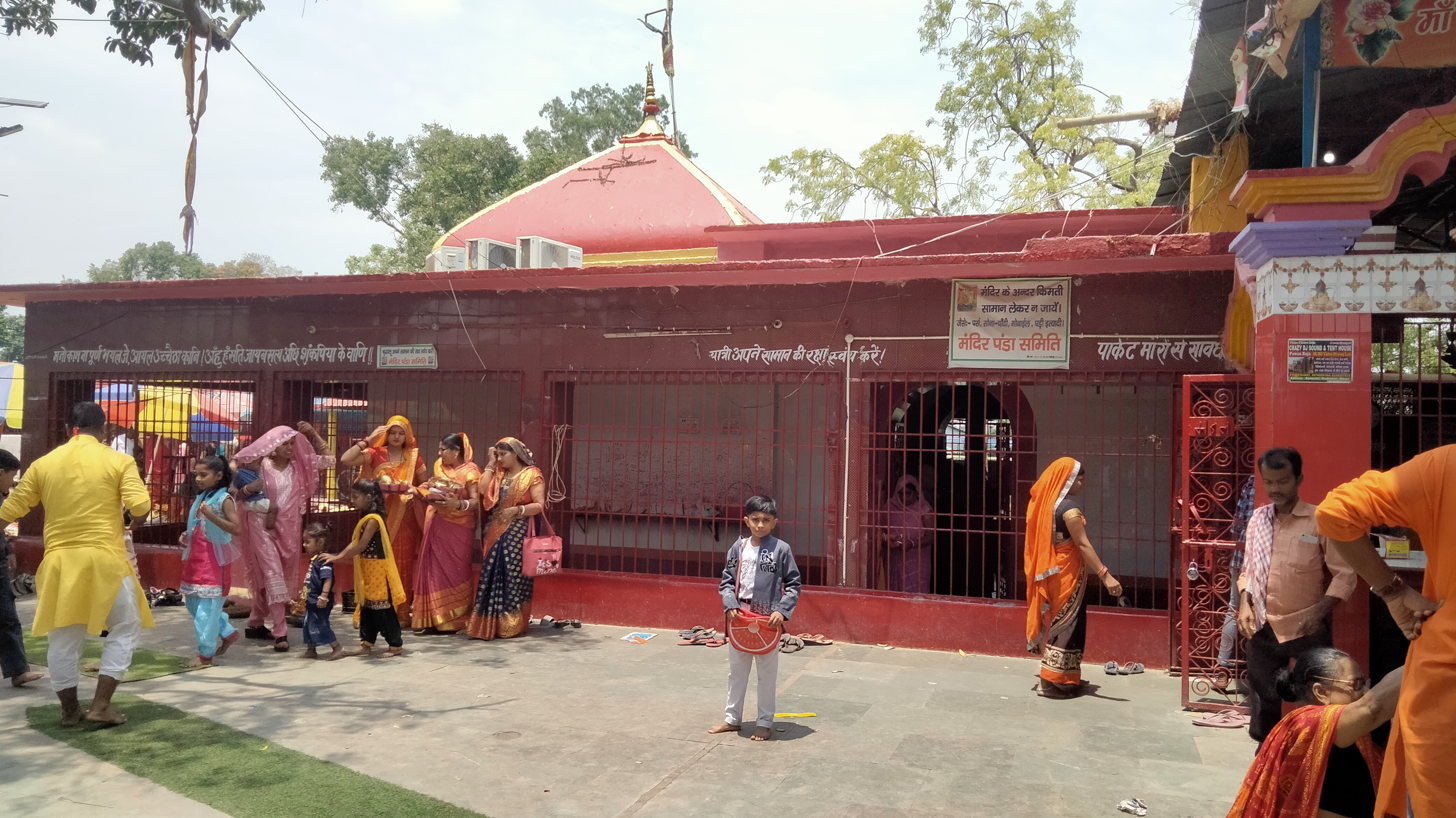
Uchchaith Bhagwati Mandir near Benipatti town.

== Etymology ==
Maharani Sthan contains two Indic terms Maharani and Sthan. The literal meaning of the term Maharani is chief queen. In Hinduism the term Maharani is also a honorific word often used to denote the Goddess Bhagawati. Similarly the literal meaning of the term Sthan is a place. In religious context, the term Sthan is often used for denoting a place of worship. Thus the literal meaning of the combined terms Maharani Sthan is the place for worship of the Goddess Bhagawati.

== Description ==
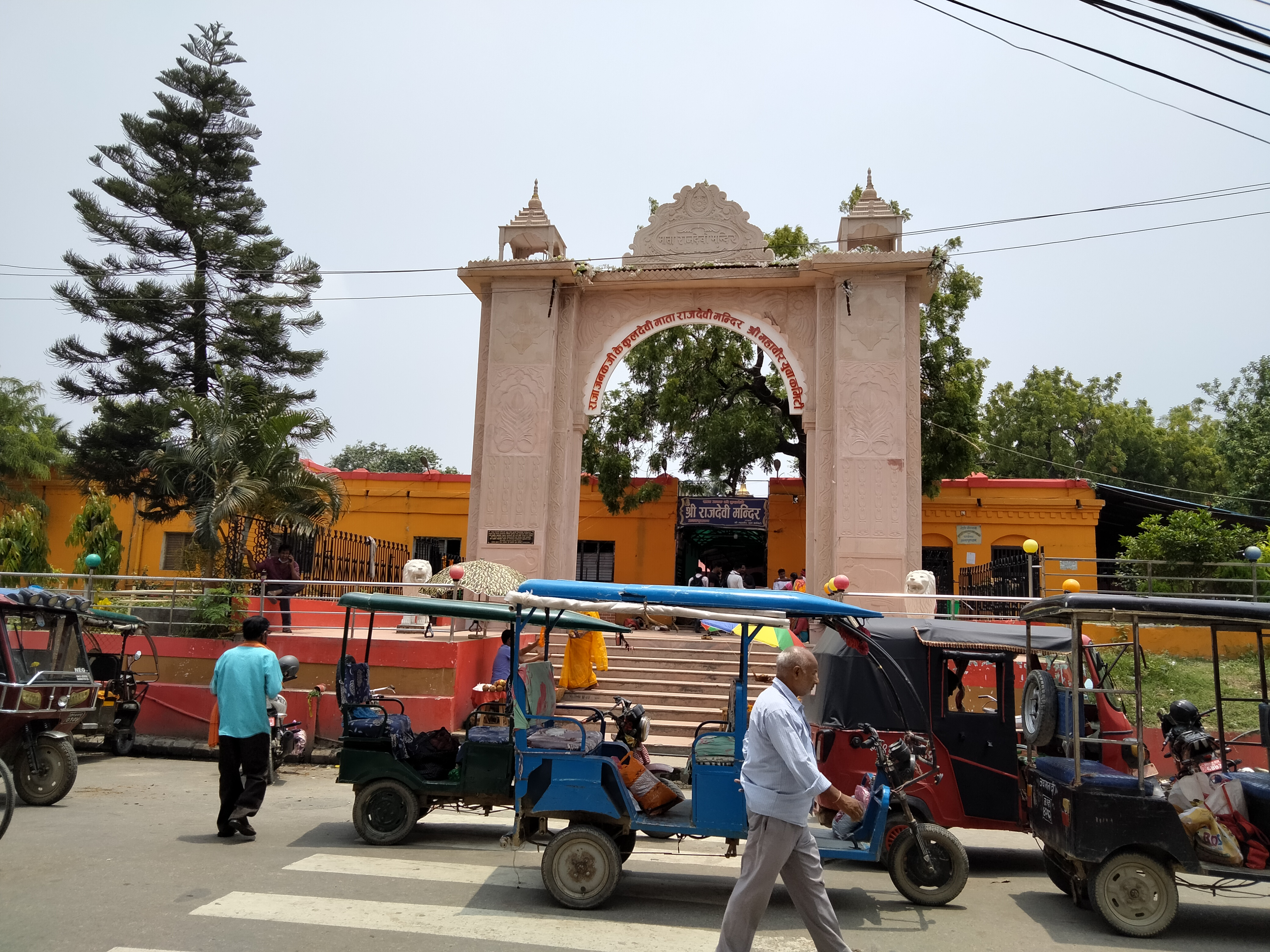
Rajdevi Mata Mandir in the city of Janakpur. Goddess Rajdevi is believed to be the Kuldevi of the King Janaka in Mithila.

In every villages of the Mithila region, the Hindu adherents had established a common worship place dedicated to the Goddess Bhagawati. The common worship place of the Goddess Bhagawati is known as Maharani Sthan. In the temple of Maharani Sthan, seven forms of Goddess Bhagwati are established. According to legend, it is believed that Goddess Bhagawati has seven sisters so in a temple of Maharani Sthan, there are seven Pinds (forms) of the Goddess Bhagawati. The seven forms of the Goddess Bhagawati are Brahmini, Maheshwari, Kaumari, Baisnavi, Barahin, Narasimha and Chamunda. In some temples of Maharani Sthan, three more forms of the Goddess Bhagawati are established. They are Rajdevi, Phulmati and Daya.

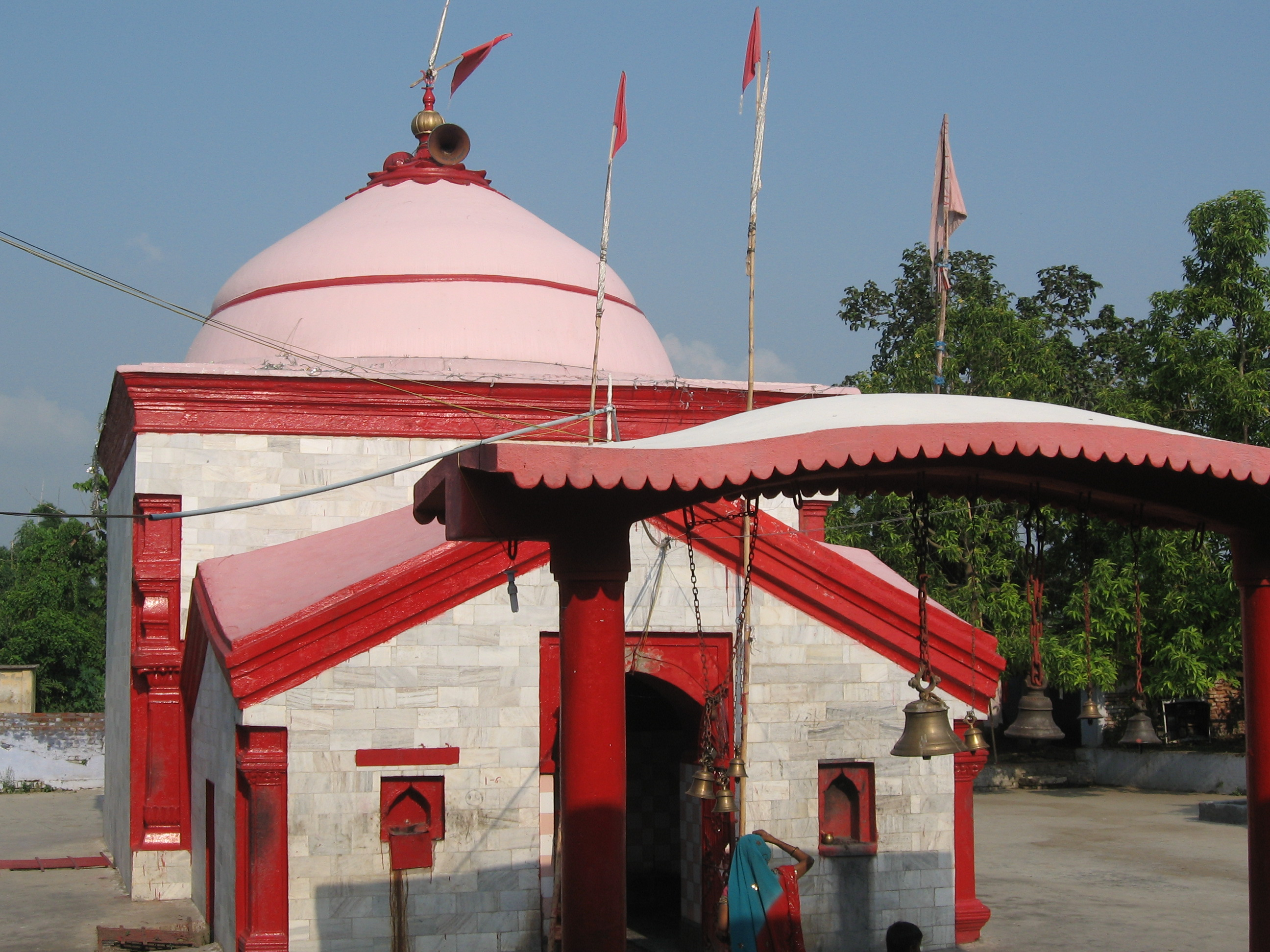
Ugratara Sthan in the Mahishi village.

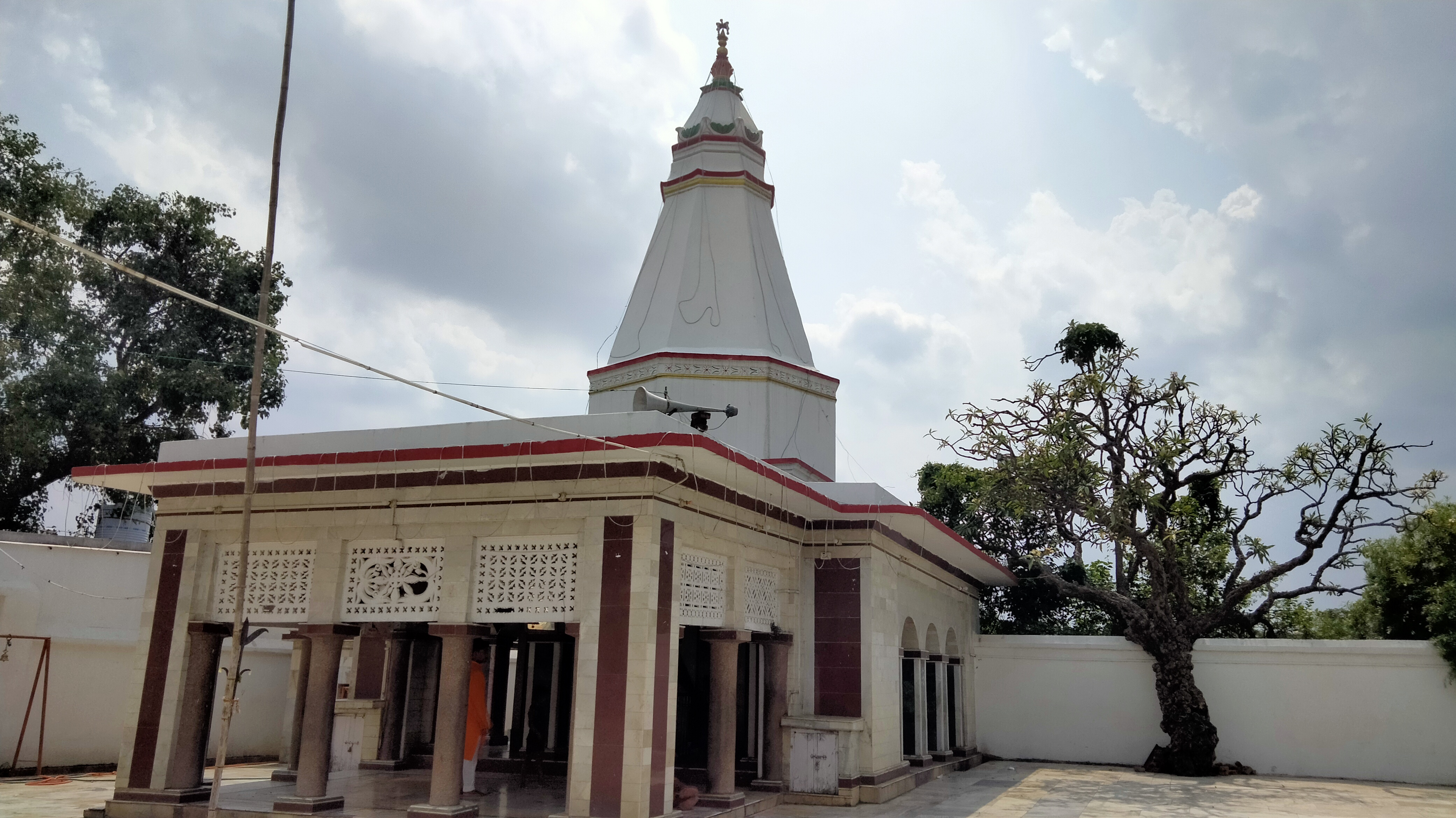
Girija Devi Mandir at Phulhar village in the Madhubani district.

In the city of Purnia, there is a Bhagwati Sthan dedicated to Goddess Purandevi. The temple is known as Purandevi Mandir. The temple is believed to be the abode of all the ten Mahavidyas of the Goddess Bhagwati.

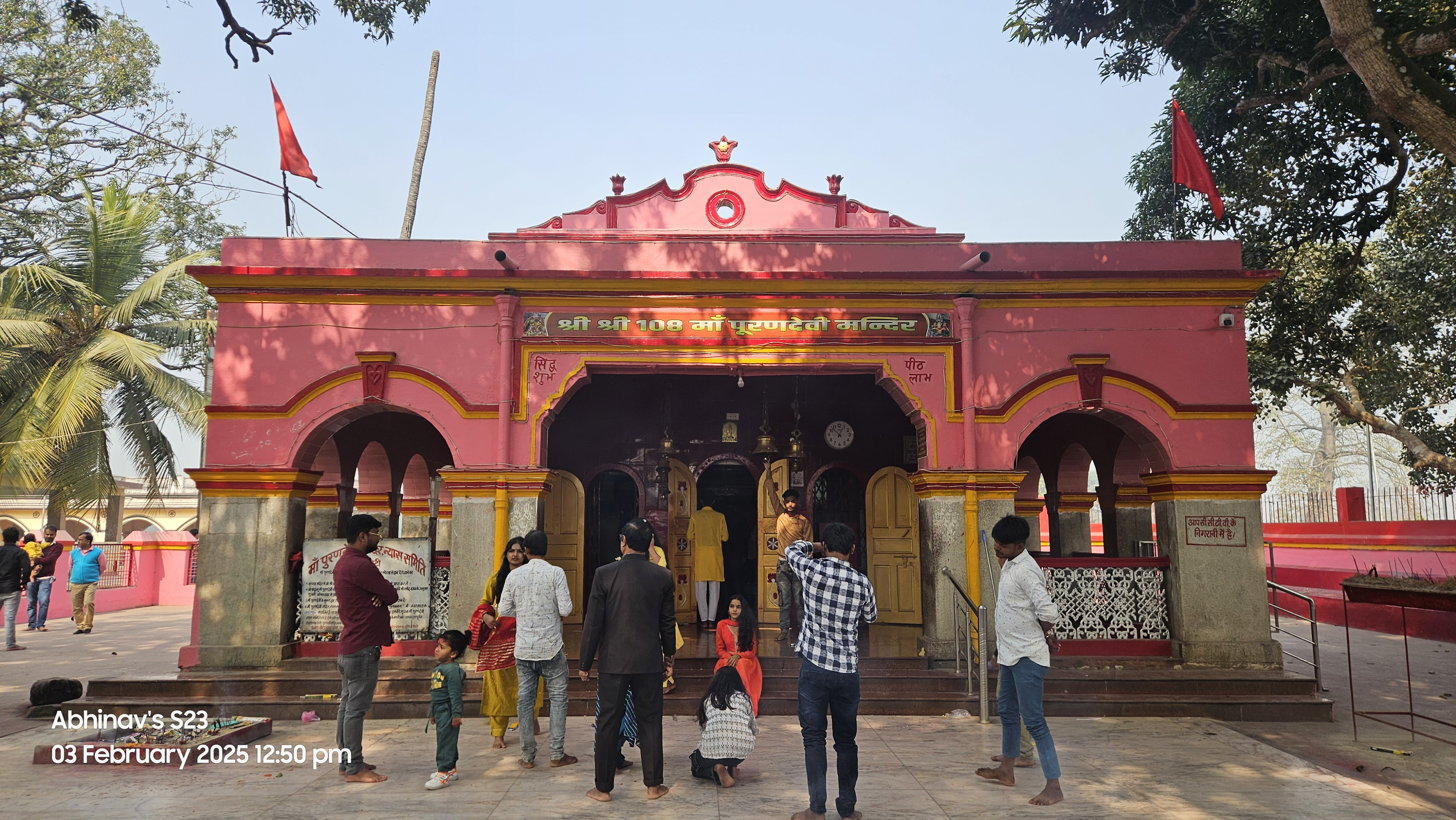
Purandevi Mandir in the city of Purnia.

== Major Maharani Sthan temples ==
1. Rajdevi Mandir in the city of Janakpur is an important Bhagwati Sthan in the region and believed to be the royal kuldevi of the King Janaka in Mithila.
2. Girija Devi Mandir at Phulhar village near the city of Janakpur is an other important Bhagawati Sthan believed to be the location of the first meeting of Lord Rama with the Goddess Sita in Mithila during the journey of Lord Rama in the Kingdom of Mithila.
3. Uchchaith Bhagawati Mandir is considered as a major Shakti Peeth in region.
4. Maharani Sthan Mandir at Jhizhat is a famous tirtha in the Pupri town of the region.
5. Ugratara Sthan at Mahishi village near Mandana Bharati Dham in the Saharsa district of the region.
6. Purandevi Mandir in the city of Purnia.
7. Raj Rajeshwari Mandir at Dokhar, Kaluahi.
