= Mandana Bharati Dham =

Mandan Bharti Dham
- मंडन भारती धाम (Maithili)
- Interactive map of Mandan Bharti Dham
- Location: Mahishi Village, Saharsa District, Mithila region, Bihar

History
- Founded: Mandana Misra
- Built for: Teaching of Mimansa Shastra

Site notes
- Architectural style: Hinduism

Mandan Bharti Dham is a historically significant site and a residential location associated with the Indian Vedic philosopher Mandana Mishra. It is situated in Mahishi village, within the Saharsa district in the Mithila region of Bihar, India. It is located near the bank of the western stream Manuaa also called as Purain of the Dharmamoola river. This site holds great reverence as a Hindu pilgrimage destination. Notably, it was the location where a significant Shastrartha (philosophical debate) occurred between two eminent Indian scholars, Adi Guru Shankaracharya and Mandana Mishra, within the Sanatana tradition. In this Shastrartha, Ubhay Bharati, the wife of Mandana Mishra was chosen as the impartial judge to adjudicate the philosophical discourse. Moreover, this location served as an educational center for the study of the Mimansa Shastra in Mithila. The Mimansa Shastra is one of the six schools of Indian philosophy.

There is a popular Sanskrit shloka explaining the Dham of Mandan Mishra as

स्वतः प्रमाणं परतः प्रमाणं शुकांगना यत्र गिरो गिरन्ति । शिष्योपशिष्यै रूपगीयमानः भवेहि तन्मण्डन मिश्र धामः ।।

The Sanskrit shloka translates to "Where parrots and mynahs are deliberating in chaste Sanskrit whether Vedas are eternal (i.e. need no proof) or have to be proven with the help of other scriptures and disciples are singing the hymns, is the abode of Mandan Mishra."

== Description ==
The campus of the Mandana Bharati Dham holds a marwa mandap in which there is a havan yajna kund for performing havan and Yajna. Adjacent to the marwa, there is a temple having idols of Mandana Mishra, Ubhaya Bharati and Adi Shankaracharya, etc. Similarly, there is a Sanskrit high school in the campus. It was established after the independence of India, by the Government of Bihar to preserve and develop Sanskrit education in the village. Initially, the school ran in a very good condition with full strength for 30 years. But later in the decade of 80s, due to the negligence of the government, the building of the school collapsed and converted into a ruins.

In the north-east direction adjacent to the Mandan Bharati Dham, there is a Shaktipeetha known as Ugratara Sthan. It is dedicated to Goddess Ugratara. In the temple of the Shaktipeetha, there is a beautiful idol of Nila Saraswati. The legend says that the Vedic scholar Mandana Mishra owed his vast learning to the Goddess Ugratara.

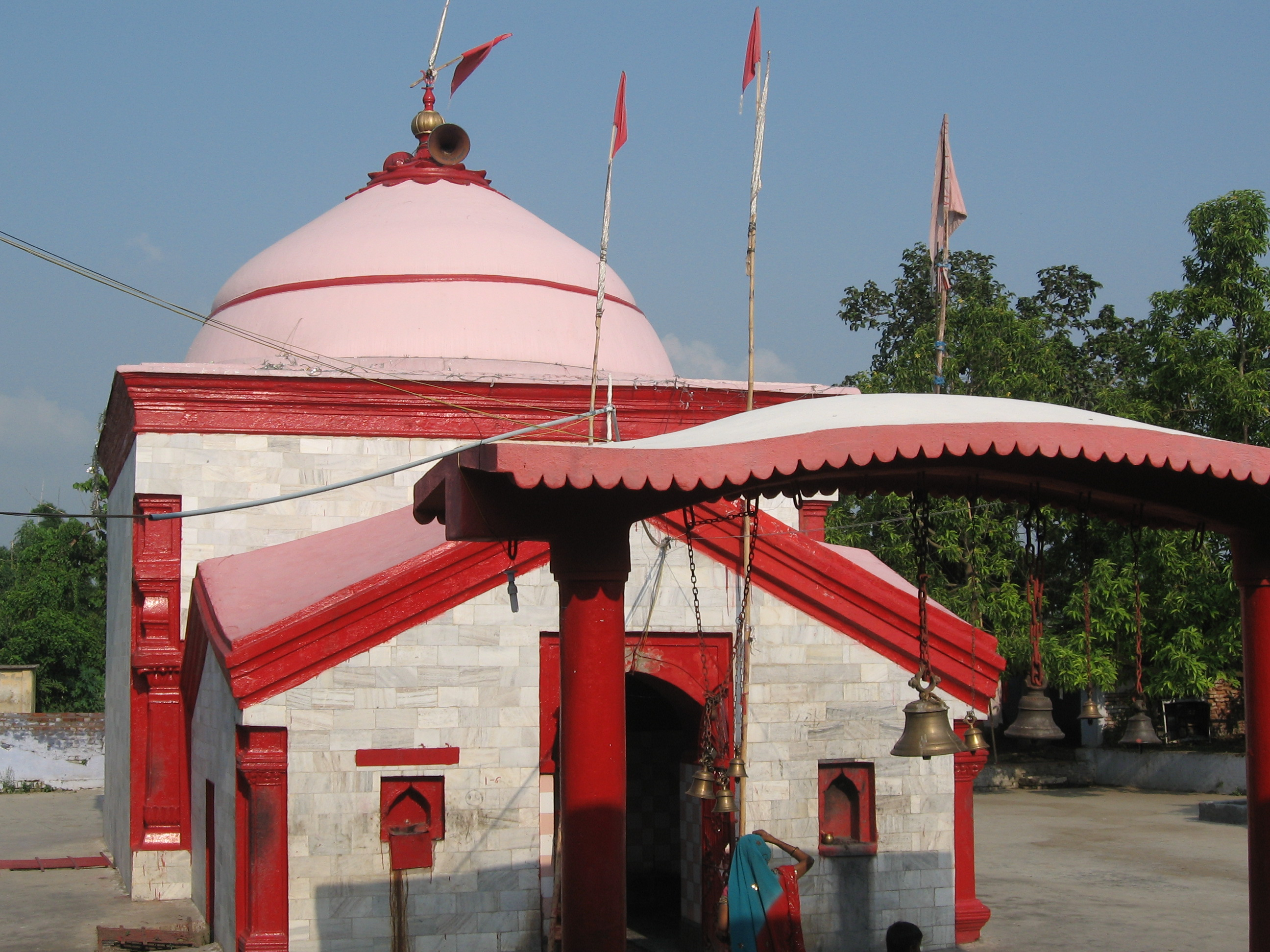
View of the Ugratara Sthan adjacent to the Mandan Bharati Dham in Mahishi, where Mandana Mishra used to pray and worship.

== History ==
The Mandan Bharati Dham is a major place related to the Sanskrit and Vedic learning in Mithila. It is said that a university was once located here whose Chancellor was Mandan Mishra. In the 8th-9th century, Adi Guru Shankaracharya came to Mahishi to debate with Mandan Mishra on Advaita Vedanta. It is said that the debate continued for 42 days. Alan Thraser, the scholar of Harvard University did his PhD on Mandan Mishra's work Brahmasiddhi in 1972. It was later published by Motilal Banarasi Das Prakashan. In 2015, the state government of Bihar declared it as a protected religious site. The initiative for declaring the site as protected religious site was initiated by the state archeological department. The site was also inspected by the local chapter of the Archeological Survey of India.

== Tourism ==
The Mandana Bharati Dham has potential for religious tourism in the village. Tourists from several states in India come here for pilgrimage. The South Indian people especially comes to the legendary site.
