= Naishkarmya Siddhi =

Naiṣkarmya Siddhiḥ
- Author: Sureśvara
- Language: Sanskrit
- Subject: Hindu philosophy
- Genre: Advaita Vedanta
- Publication place: India

Naiṣkarmya-siddhi is a treatise on Advaita Vedanta written by Sureśvara, one of the direct disciples of Ādi Śaṅkara, in approximately the 8th century. It comprises 423 verses divided into four chapters. Along with Brahma-siddhi of Maṇḍana Miśra, the Advaita-siddhi of Madhusūdana Sarasvatī and the Iṣṭa-siddhi of Vimuktātman, it is considered to be one of the four most important works in the siddhi-literature tradition of Advaita, which comprises the stating of the essence of Advaita along with new facets brought out by defending the theology from rival schools.

The text presents a mixture of metrical verses and sections of prose, known as sambandhakoti. The sambandhakoti are used for several purposes including to introduce the verses, to introduce problems for discussion, to state objections of opponent philosophers and to respond to objects and to explain connections between verses. Sureśvara himself makes it clear that sambandhakoti is not a commentary but an essential part of the original text.

The text loosely follows the treatise Upadeśa Sāhasrī of Śankara, particularly its 18th chapter.

== Contents ==
The first chapter comprises 100 verses and primarily deals with the central theme of how ignorance of the true nature of the self is the source of bondage and how this can be rectified exclusively by knowledge of the self as opposed to via religious rites and other forms of action. The second chapter comprises 119 verses and is centered on distinction between the self and not-self, with primary focus on distinguishing the mind from the self. The third chapter, 126 verses, discusses the locus and content of ignorance as well as an in-depth analysis of the mahāvākyam 'tat tvam asi' ["That you are."] The fourth and final chapter, of 78 verses, focuses on summarizing the first three chapters and then on citing references for Sureśvara's ideas within the Advaita tradition, especially the canonical texts the Upadeśa Sāhasrī of Śankara and the Māṇḍūkya-kārikā of Gauḍapāda. It also discusses whether or not the individual who has attained self-knowledge is required to continue following scriptural injunctions and prohibitions.

== Origin of text ==
There is a traditional story told about the origin of the treatise. It is said that originally Śankara wanted Sureśvara to write a metrical commentary upon Śankara's magna opus, his commentary on the Brahma Sūtras. However, since Sureśvara was a recent convert to Advaita from the rival ritual-oriented theology Pūrva Mīmāṃsā, Śankara's other disciples objected, concerned that Sureśvara could misinterpret the commentary. In the end, Śankara commanded Sureśvara to write an independent treatise on Advaita, which became the Naiṣkarmya Siddhi.

== Commentaries ==
Two important commentaries on the text include the Klesāpahārinī by Satchidanandendra Saraswati and the Candrika of Jñānottama. Swamī Paramārthānanda Sarasvatī, disciple of Dayānanda Sarasvatī, has conducted 251 talks on the text in English.
