= Khyativada =

Indian philosophical theories of Perceptual Error

Khyātivāda (Sanskrit: ख्यातिवादाः) is the term for Indian theories of perceptual error. The word khyāti (ख्यातिः) refers to 'erroneous conception' or 'false apprehension', and vāda means - 'theory' or 'position'. These are all theories that deal with the nature of the object of erroneous perception and not with the nature of the subject, whether the error consists in the object or in the subject’s cognition.

== Theories of error ==
Almost all schools of Indian philosophy developed both theories of accurate perception and theories of erroneous perception. Although these theories differ in their understanding of error, they are all fundamentally about an erroneous cognition like "this is silver" regarding a shell, and the question they ask is what that erroneous cognition is about. The inquiry is primarily about the nature of the object of the erroneous cognition. Questions like these are asked: What is its ontological status? Is the object real or non-existent, present to the senses or present elsewhere and just remembered? Khyātivāda is based on the assumption that misperception is not simply the human failure to perceive correctly but is something which occurs due to some peculiar special circumstances.

=== Asat-khyātivāda ===
Translating to "apprehension of the non-existent", this theory is affirmed within Madhyamaka Buddhism. The theory states that the object of the erroneous cognition is non-existent.

=== Ātma-khyātivāda ===
This theory, which translates to "self-apprehension" or "apprehension of itself", is held by Yogācārā Buddhism. The school's central thesis is that a cognition does not require an object that is distinct from itself. Because there are no mind-independent objects according to this school, it holds that the cognition is itself erroneously taken to be the object.

=== Akhyātivāda ===
The theory of "non-apprehension" is proposed by Prābhākara Mīmāṃsā, which does not hold that error exists in the first place. There is merely the failure to distinguish between perception and memory, it is due to the lack of right discrimination vis-à-vis memory. The view is also called non-apprehension of distinction (vivekākhyāti).

=== Anyathā-khyātivāda ===
The theory of "misapprehension" is of the Nyāya and Vaiśeṣika schools. The object is real elsewhere, not here in front of the perceiver because of the mind connected with the object on account of memory, the error is due to wrong understanding of the presented and the represented. It occurs, as Vachaspati Mishra states, when "one reality is mistaken for another".

=== Viparītakhyātivāda ===
There is only a slight difference between this theory, which translates to "contrary apprehension" and is held within the Bhāṭṭa Mīmāṃsā school, and anyathākhyātivāda. Like anyathākhyātivāda, this theory also says that the error is due to mistaking one thing as another. But unlike anyathākhyātivāda, it does not say that the sense is actually in contact with silver.

=== Anirvacanīyakhyātivāda ===
The theory of "apprehension of the indescribable" is proposed by the Advaita school of Vedānta. The object is neither existent (सत्) nor non-existent (असत्) but indescribable (अनिर्वचनियम्), the illusory object is a product of ignorance (avidyā) about the substratum and the error is caused due to Maya which is also indescribable.

Knowledge presupposes a subject of that knowledge and also the object corresponding to it. The nature of knowledge however depends upon the mind and the cognitive faculties of the subject as also on the conditions in which the object is situated in relation to the subject; an error is caused due to a peculiar relation formed by the perceiver and the position of the object. Inference, a valid mode of cognition, is based on previous perception, and an erroneous perception negates the value of perception.

=== Apūrṇakhyāti-vāda ===
This is a Pratyabhijñā theory of error that argues that error is due to an "incomplete cognition" (apūrṇakhyāti).

== Vedanta ==
Shankara explains that in Sampat Upasana there is the imposing (aropa) of a superior character on the inferior whereas in Pratika (adhyasa) Upasana the inferior form is contemplated as Brahman. Āropa or illusion is 'mis-cognition' (avidyā), 'mis-appearance' (avabhāsa), 'superimposition' (adhyāsa), a 'misapplication' or a 'mis-presentation' which is not consciously persuaded unlike misperception and misunderstanding; and in which, neither the agent nor the subject have any active role to play. But, Aropa is not Adhyasa because there has to be an appearance which can make the delusive illusory appearance of a particular appearance a distinct possibility. Badarayana states that:-

पराभिध्यानातु तिरोहितं ततो ह्यस्य बन्धविपर्ययौ |

"From the meditation on the supreme Lord, however, becomes manifest that which remains obscured; because the soul’s bondage and freedom are derived from Him." - (Brahma Sutras III.ii.5)

which is so because bondage comes from the ignorance about the nature of God, and freedom comes from the knowledge of His reality when as a result of meditation on Him (with attributes) comes unsurpassable divinity and one becomes the Absolute with all the desires fulfilled. (Shvetashvatara Upanishad I.11). And that:-

अत एव चोपमा सूर्यकादिवत् |

"Hence also are the illustrations of the sun’s reflection (in water) etc." – (Brahma Sutras III.ii.19)

which statement, Shankara explains, means that the one with attributes created by limiting adjuncts is not real but though One and present in all beings is seen as many.

Aropa can be verbal (śabdi), and it can also be based upon sense (arthi) (meaning or implied), sometimes it is not expressed but is conveyed. Advaita Vedanta does not view the world of existence as an absolute reality, it is an imposition (aropa), it simply does not exist from the absolute standpoint; it is Anatman which the Atman accepts as a device for the purpose of self-realization, and for experiencing Divine Unity, the inseparableness of Atman and Anatman.

The Dvaita School of Madhvacharya does not accept the Advaita illusionistic hypothesis or interpretation of reality as being deceptive and merely appearance-interpreting. Jayatirtha, while discussing Khyātivāda, rejects Prabhākara’s view of the fusion of two cognitions i.e. fusion of percept and memory, resulting in illusory cognition.
