= Triputipratyaksavada =

Hindu philosophical concept

Tripuṭi-pratyakṣavāda , this term refers to Prabhakara’s Theory of Knowledge, more precisely to his Doctrine of Triple Perception.

Prabhakara advocates the theory of simultaneous revelation of knower, known and knowledge (Tripuṭi-pratyakṣavāda). He holds the Nayayika view that the self is essentially unconscious but maintains that knowledge is self-luminous, which knowledge reveals the self as the subject and the known thing as the object simultaneously with itself. In every knowledge-situation the self is simultaneously revealed as the subject of that knowledge. The self is not self-luminous and requires knowledge for its manifestation, and is necessarily implied in every knowledge as the subject but it can never become an object; it is impossible to know the self as an object. Prabhakara, whose work has been commented upon by Salikanatha, as a thinker is more original than Kumarila. Salikanatha’s commentary is known as Rjuvimalapancika.

According to Tripuṭi-pratyakṣavāda or the "Doctrine of Triple Perception", perception, which is direct apprehension, recognizes the self, its object, and itself; the self and the object which are not luminous and do not manifest themselves, are manifested by cognition which is self-luminous and manifests itself, they are manifested by every cognition, presentative or representative. In every cognition of an object there are a consciousness of an object, and a consciousness of the cognition that can never be known as an object. Cognition apprehends itself, its existence is inferred from the apprehension of its object. Prabhakara refutes Kumarila’s "Doctrine of Inferability of a cognition" on the ground that there is no reason or mark from which cognition may be inferred, the existence of an object cannot serve as the mark of inference, also the cognition of an object cannot be the mark of inference. Cognition is manifested to consciousness, a cognitive act cannot be inferred from non-manifestation of the objective-perception, and the manifestation of the object-cognition does not depend upon any other cognition, since it is not known to exist. A self-cognized cognition manifests an object.
