= Bhatpura =

Village in Darbhanga district

Bhatpura भटपुरा
- Village
- Bhatpura
- Etymology: Bhatta+Pura = City of Bhatta
- Interactive map of Bhatpura
- Country: India
- State: Bihar
- Region: Mithila
- District: Darbhanga
- Block: Manigachhi
- Gram panchayat: Brahmapura-Bhatpura
- Founder: Bhatta family
- Named for: Bhatta surname of Kumarila Bhatta
- Demonym: Maithil

Language
  - Official: Hindi

Regional languages
  - Mother tongue: Ancient: Maithili; Sanskrit
- Kumarila Bhatta Dih - A centre of the Sanskrit and Vedic learning in Mithila.

Bhatpura ( Maithili: भटपुरा ) is a historical village in the Mithila region of the Indian subcontinent. It is located in the Manigachhi block of the Darbhanga district in the state of Bihar in India. The name of the gram panchayat of the village is Brahmapura-Bhatpura. It is the birthplace of the renowned Mimansa scholar Kumarila Bhatta. It was also the native place of Ubhaya Bharati in Mithila.

In the village, there is a Shiva temple known as Satyuga Nath Mandir. Similarly, the village holds an important historical dih of the Mithila region related to the 8th century CE scholar Kumarila Bhatta. It is known as Kumarila Bhatta Dih.
