= Jawabipur =

- village
- Jawabipur
- Nickname: जवाबीपुर
- Interactive map of Jawabipur
- Coordinates: 26°35′38″N 85°32′54″E
- Country: India
- State: Bihar
- District: Sitamarhi
- Talukas: Dumra; Sitamarhi

Government
  - Type: Municipal Corporation (Ngar Nigam Sitamarhi)
  - Body: Ward Commissioner

Population (Census 2011)
  - Total: 13,623
- Time zone: UTC+5:30 (IST)
- Postal code: 843302
- ISO 3166 code: IN-BR
- Vehicle registration: BR
- By: Purendra Kumar Shakya

Jawabipur is a Colony/Nagar in Sitamarhi Municipal Corporation of Sitamarhi District, in Bihar, India. It is administered by the Sitamarhi Nagar nigam Nagar Nigam of Tirhut Division. Some are the Localities/Landmark in Jawabipur are Durga Chowk, Shakya Chowk, Hanuman Chowk, Utkramit Madhya Vidhyalaya, Hanuman Mandir, Brahm Sthan, Maharani Sthan, Athani and Bholahiya. It is situated 7 km (4.3 mi) away from sub-district headquarter Dumra and 6 km (3.7 mi) away from district headquarter Sitamarhi. Maithili and Vajjika is the Local Language here. JDU, BJP, RJD, and INC are the major political parties in this area. Nearest cities are Sitamarhi, Muzaffarpur, Darbhanga, Patna and Motihari. Most residents from Jawabipur having surname Mahto, Kushwaha, Shakya, Singh, Paswan, Sharma and Ram. Kushwaha family from Jawabipur claim that they are descent from Emperor Ashoka. Samrat Ashoka the great belongs to the Maurya dynasty, which was one of the dynasties in ancient Indian history. Chandragupt Maurya was the founder of Maurya dynasty and the first emperor to unify most of the Indian subcontinent.

Sitamarhi is nearest town to Jawabipur, and is approximately 6.5 km (4.0 mi) away. Nearest railway station is Sitamarhi Junction and Dumra railway station. Pin code of Jawabipur is 843302 and postal head office is Dumra.

Jawabipur is surrounded by Dumra Block towards South, Riga Block towards west, Bathanaha Block towards North, Bajpatti Block towards East. Sitamarhi, Sheohar, Bairgania, Muzaffarpur, Sursand, Sonwarsa, Darbhanga, Motihari, and Madhubani are the nearby cities to Jawabipur.

Historical sanctuary of Mauryan period is found near Jawabipur. Most of Population from Jawabipur are Kushwana Caste (Koiri) which are descent from the Suryavansh dynasty through Kusha. Some other caste Lohar, paswan, Ram and Nai are also habitat.
