= Apadeva =

Indian scholar

Apa-deva (IAST: Āpadeva) was a 17th-century Indian scholar, who wrote Mimamsa-nyaya-prakasha, a Sanskrit-language treatise on the purva mimamsa tradition.

== Biography ==
Apadeva probably flourished in early 17th century. He was a great-grandson of Ekanatha, who was likely not same as the 16th-century saint Ekanatha. His grand-father was also named Apa-deva, and his father was Ananta-deva.

Apadeva followed the Bhatta school of the mimamsa philosophy, and wrote Mimamsa-nyaya-prakasha (IAST: Mīmāṃsā-nyāya-prakāśa; also known as Apadevi), a guidebook for purva mimamsa.

Apadeva's son was named Ananta-deva (like Apadeva's father), and composed Smrti-kaustubha, which is the main source of information about Apadeva. It is not clear if Apadeva's son Ananta is same as Ananta Bakarista, who wrote Nakshatra-sattrahautra. The grandson of Apadeva's son Ananta was also named Ananta-deva (fl. c. 1675), and composed a text on astrology, titled Nakshatra-sattreshti-rayoga or Nakshtreshti-nirupana.
