= Sureśvara =

9th century Indian philosopher

Religious life
- Religion: Hinduism

Religious career
- Teacher: Adi Shankara

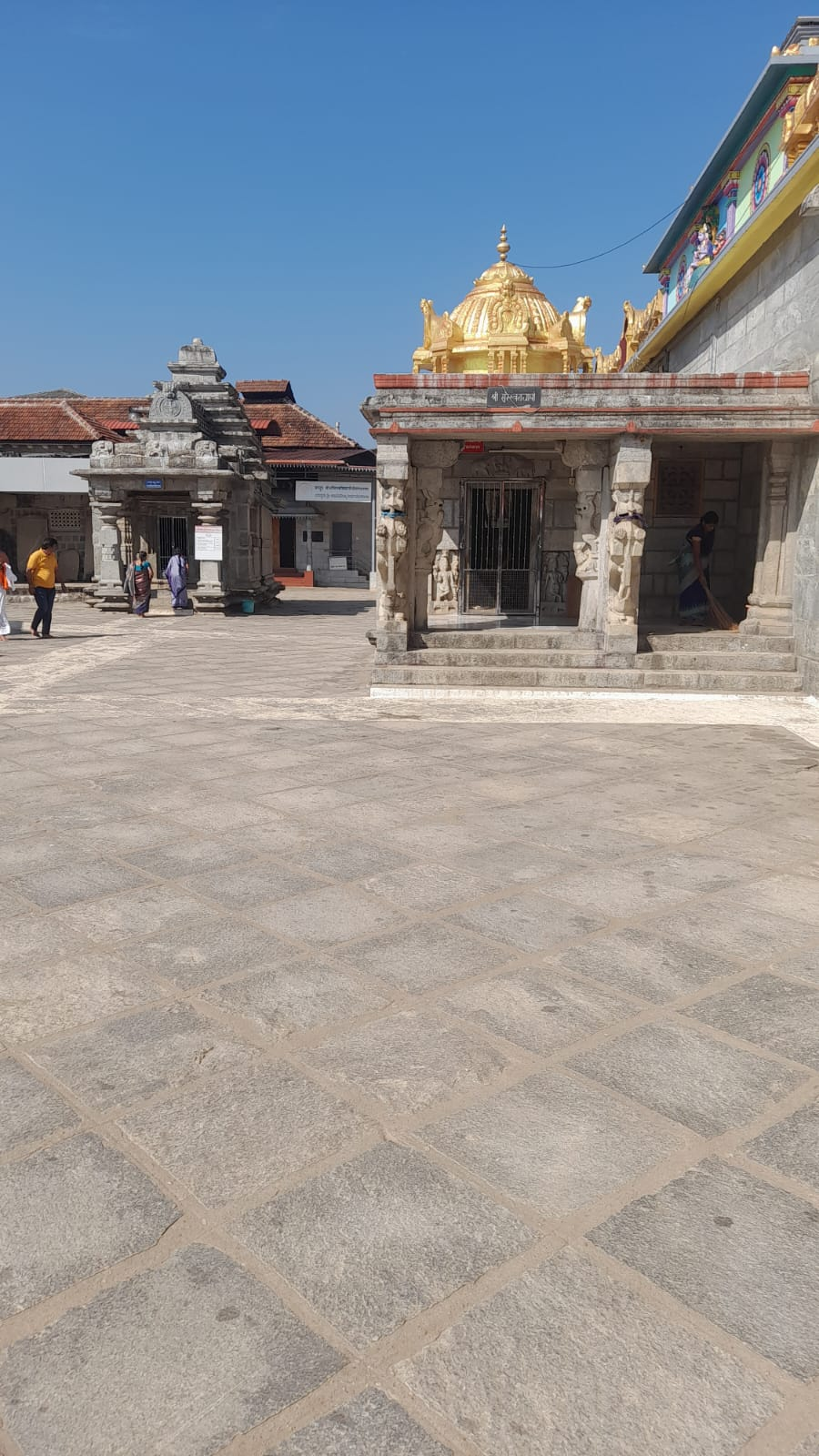
Burial place of Sureshvaracharya, marked by golden dome, in the premises of the Sringeri Sharada Peetham, Karnataka, India

Sureśvara (also known as Sureśvarācārya, was a 9th-century Indian philosopher, who studied under Śankara. Śankara is said to have entrusted to Sureśvara his first monastic institution, the Sringeri Sharada Peetham. Sureśvara is believed to have founded the Naduvil Matham in Thrissur. His Maha Samadhi is located near the Sharada temple of Sringeri Mutt in Sringeri Karnataka.

== Life ==
Little is known for sure about Sureśvara's life. According to a persistent but erroneous tradition within Advaita Vedānta, before he became a disciple of Śankara, Sureśvara was known as Maṇḍana Miśra, a Mīmāmsāka. After being defeated in a debate by Śankara, Miśra renounced his life as a householder and became a sannyāsin. Whether this Maṇḍana Miśra was the same as the author of Brahmasiddhi is questioned by modern scholars on the basis of textual analysis.

Sureśvara was the Advaita tradition's Vārttikakāra (commentator), meticulously and critically examining Śankara's work. In his non-commentary work, the Naiṣkarmyasiddhi, he presents Avdaita philosophy clearly and simply.

== Identification with Maṇḍana Miśra ==
Maṇḍana Miśra has often been identified with Sureśvara. Sureśvara (fl. 800–900 CE) and Maṇḍana Miśra were contemporaries of Śankara. Both explained Śankara "on the basis of their personal convictions."

According to Kuppuswami Sastri, it is not likely that Maṇḍana Miśra, the author of Brahmasiddhi, is identical with Sureśvara, but the tradition is correct in describing Maṇḍana Miśra and Śankara as contemporaries. His critical edition of the Brahmasiddhi also points out that the name Maṇḍana Miśra is both a title and a first name, which is a possible cause for a confusion of personalities. Maṇḍana Miśra's brand of Advaita differs in certain critical details from that of Śhankara, whereas Sureśvara's thought is very faithful to that of Śankara.

According to Sharma, Hiriyanna and Kuppuswami Sastra have pointed out that Sureśvara and Maṇḍana Miśra had different views on various doctrinal points:

- The locus of avidyā: according to Maṇḍana Miśra, the individual jīva is the locus of avidyā, whereas Sureśvara contents that avidyā regarding brahman is located in brahman. These two different stances are also reflected in the opposing positions of the Bhamati school and the Vivarana school.
- Liberation: according to Maṇḍana Miśra, the knowledge which arises from the mahāvākya is insufficient for liberation. Only the direct realization of brahman is liberating, which can only be attained by meditation. According to Sureśvara, this knowledge is directly liberating, while meditation is at best a useful aid.

R. Balasubramanian disagrees with the arguments of Kuppuswami Sastri and others, and argued that there is no conclusive evidence available to prove that Maṇḍana, the author of the Brahmasiddhi, is different from Sureśvara, the author of the Naiṣkarmyasiddhi and the Vārtikas.

== Works ==
- Bṛhadāraṇyakopaniṣad-bhāṣya-vārttika (commentary on Śankara's works on the Bṛhadāraṇyaka Upaniṣad)
- Naiṣkarmya-siddhi (non-commentary)
- Sambandha-vārttika (commentary on Śankāra's introduction to the Bṛhadāraṇyaka Upaniṣad)
- Taittirīya-vārttika (commentary on Śankāra's work on the Taittirīya Upaniṣad)
- Manasollasa (commentary on Dakṣiṇamūrti-Stotra)
- Pañcī-karaṇa-vārttika (commentary on Śankara's Pañcī-karaṇam)

== See also ==
- Sringeri Sharada Peetham

== Sources ==
- Kuppuswami Sastri, S. (1984), Brahmasiddhi, by Maṇḍanamiśra, with commentary by Śankhapāṇī. 2nd ed., Delhi, India: Sri Satguru Publications
- Roodurmum, Pulasth Soobah (2002), Bhāmatī and Vivaraṇa Schools of Advaita Vedānta: A Critical Approach, Delhi: Motilal Banarsidass Publishers Private Limited
- Sharma, C. (1997), A Critical Survey of Indian Philosophy, Motilal Banarsidass, ISBN 81-208-0365-5
