= Bhatsimar =

Villages of the Mithila region

Coordinates: 26°22′05″N 86°13′14″E

- Village
- Bhatsimar Panchayat
- Interactive map of Bhatsimar
- Country: India
- State: Bihar
- Region: Mithila
- Division: Darbhanga
- District: Madhubani
- Block: Rajnagar

Bhatsimar is a historical village in the Mithila region of the Indian subcontinent. It is located in the Rajnagar block of the Madhubani district in the state of Bihar in India. Before the formation of the Madhubani district, it was under the older Darbhanga district. It is divided into two gram panchayats: Bhatsimar East Panchayat and Bhatsimar West Panchayat. According to legend, Kumarila Bhatta came out of the village of Bhatsimar to hoist the flag of Sanatan Dharma in the subcontinent and the world. In the village, there is dih attributed to him known as Kumarila Bhatta Dih.

The village holds a very famous temple dedicated to Lord Shiva. The temple is known as Baba Neelmaninath Sthan. The young people of the village are very found of playing cricket. The village has a cricket team which takes part in tournaments organised in the region.
