= Ugratara Sthan =

Shaktipeetha in Mithila

Coordinates: 25°50′54″N 86°28′23″E

- उग्रतारा स्थान
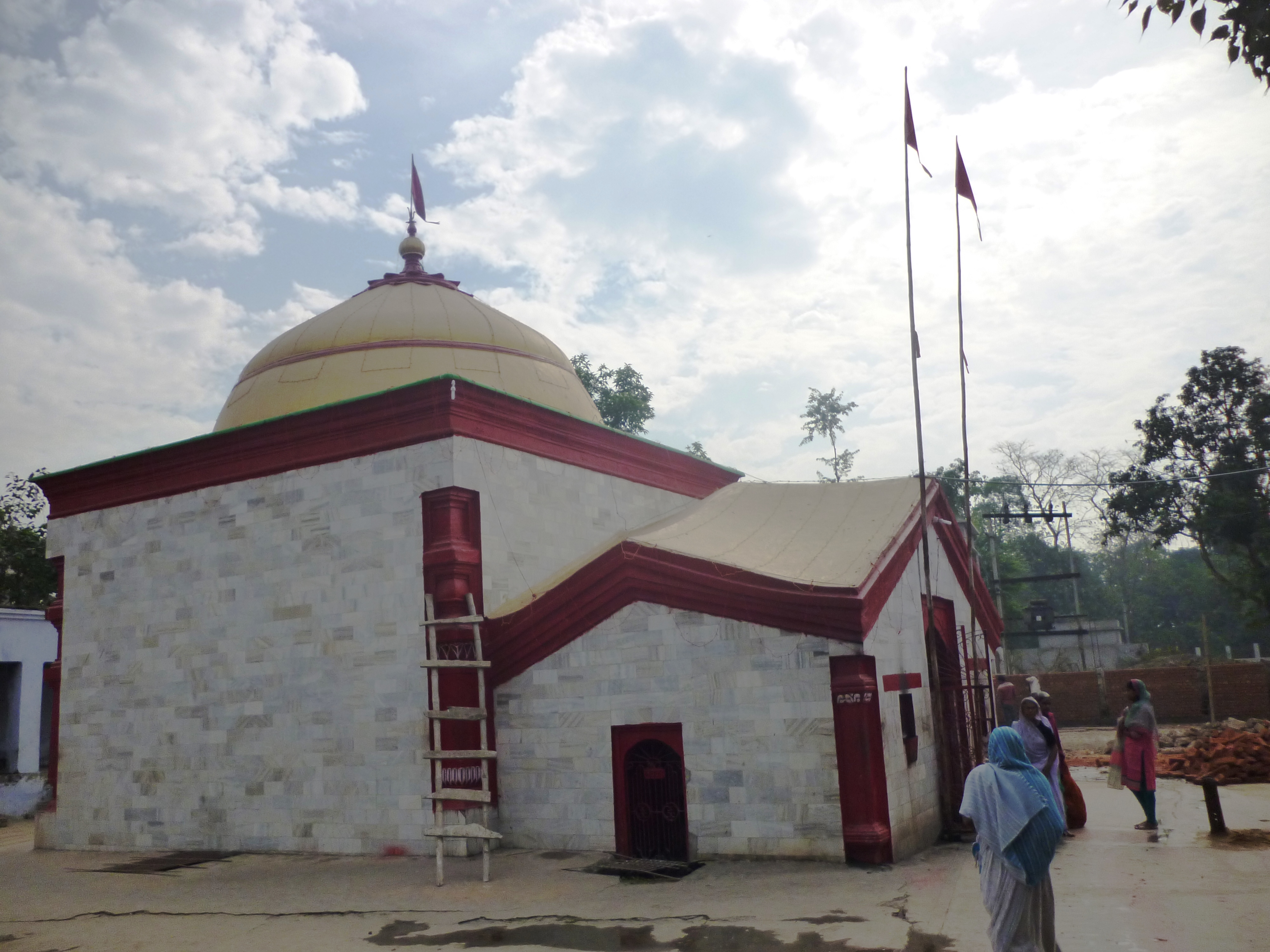
- Exterior of Ugratara Sthan.

Religion
- Affiliation: Hinduism
- Deity: Ugratara

Location
- Location: Mahishi, Saharsa district
- State: Bihar
- Country: India

Architecture
- Type: Tirhut style
- Founder: Queen Padmavati of Raj Darbhanga
- Established: 16th century CE

Ugratara Sthan (Maithili: उग्रतारा स्थान), also known as Ugratara Mandir, or Tarapith is a Shaktipeetha in the Mithila region of Bihar in India. It is situated at Mahishi village in the Saharsa district of Bihar. It is an ancient shrine known for Tantra Sadhana in Hinduism. The present temple was built in the 16th century by Queen Padmavati of the Raj Darbhanga in Mithila. It is 17 kilometres west of the Saharsa Railway Junction.

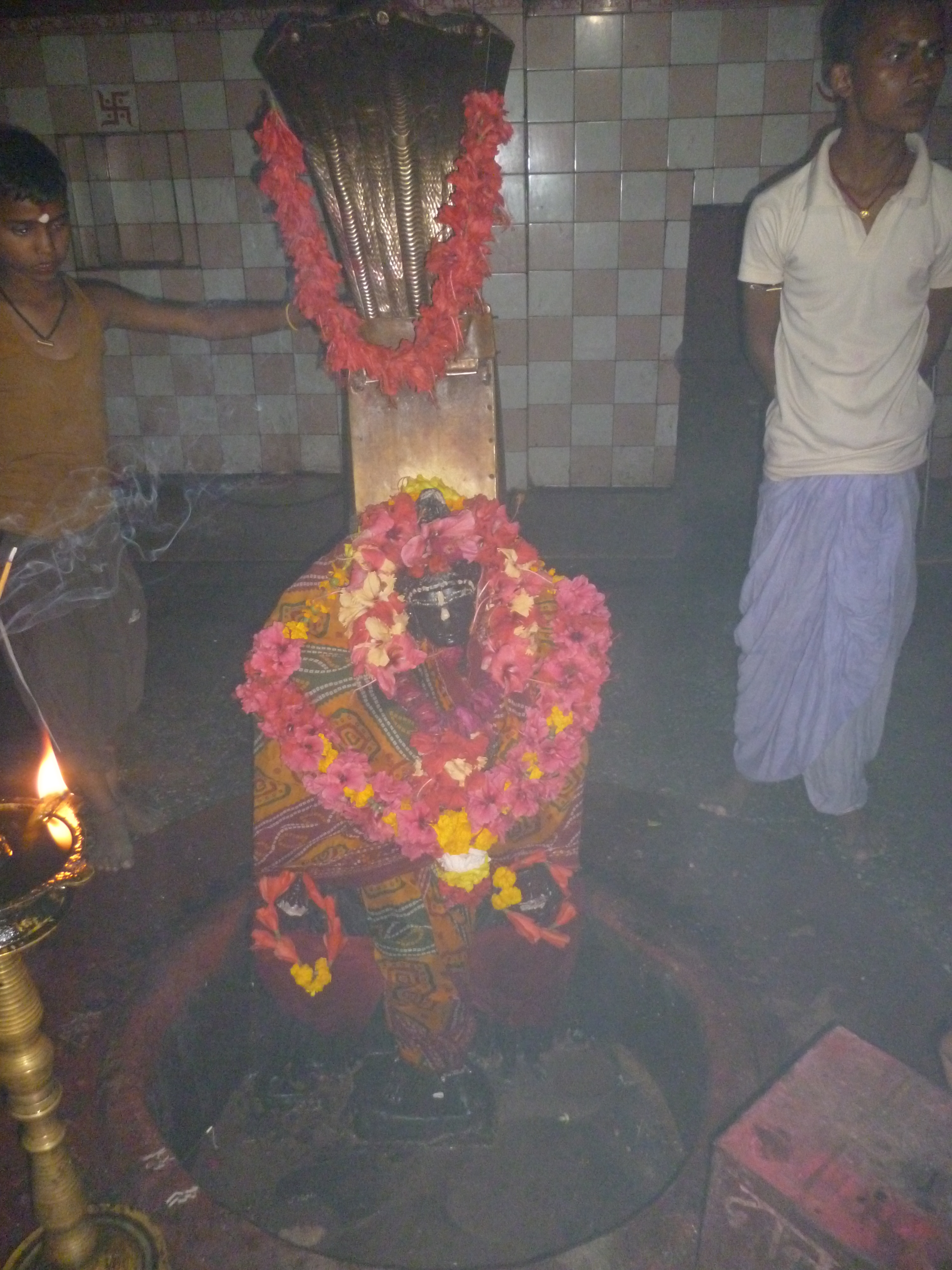
View of the deity inside the temple of Ugratara Sthan.

== Etymology ==
Ugratara is a compound Sanskrit word from Ugra and Tara. The Indic term ugra means "difficult" or "tough", and Tara is a form of the goddess Bhagwati. According to legend, it is said that the Vedic sage Vashishtha conducted a very tough penance called an ugratapa to please the goddess Tara here, so that because of this ugratapa ("difficult penance") of her first devotee Vashistha, it is known as Ugratara.

== See also ==
- Uchhaith
- Raj Rajeshwari Mandir
- Mandana Bharati Dham
