= Śālikanātha =

Śālikanātha was a Mīmāṃsā philosopher (Pūrva Mīmāṃsā) of roughly 800 AD, a follower of Prabhākara (6th century) and an opponent of the Bhāṭṭa school started by Kumārila Bhaṭṭa in the 7th century. Śālikanātha is believed to have written the Prakaraṇapañcikā, which is one of the very few texts available to us to study the Prābhākara school of Pūrva Mīmāṃsā. Śālikanātha also wrote Ṛjuvimalāpañcikā and Dīpaśikhāpañcikā commentaries on Prabhākara.
