= Prabhākara =

Indian philosopher

Prabhākara Guru

Personal life
- Born: Kerala c. 6th century Malabar; Chera dynasty
- Known for: Indian philosopher
- Honors: Founder of Gurumata or Prābhākara System

Religious life
- Religion: Vedic Hinduism
- Philosophy: Mīmāṃsā
- Hermeneutics; Vedic Exegesis

Prabhakara (IAST: Prabhākara) active c. 6th century was an Indian philosopher-grammarian in the Mīmāṃsā tradition of Kerala.

== Probable date ==
Hariswamin's commentary on Shatapatha Brahmana which dates to 638 CE discusses the doctrine of Prabhākara's followers. Prabhākara in his commentary Bṛhatī on the Śabara Bhāṣya quotes only Bhartṛhari (4-5 CE) and Bharavi (5-6 CE). Thus his probable time can be assigned to the latter half of the 6th century.

His views on Śabara’s Bhāṣya, a commentary on Jaimini’s Pūrvamīmāmsā Sūtras led to rise of Prābhākara school within Mīmāṃsā and further developed as competent philosophical system along with the rival school of Kumārila Bhaṭṭa.

The Prābhākara school is alleged to be nastika (atheistic) or Charvaka|Lokāyata school.

Kumārila said: For in practice the Mimamsa has been for the most part converted into a Lokayata system; But I have made this effort to bring it into a theistic path.

Here Kumārila refers to Bhartriprapancha, held by somebody as the forerunner of the Prābhākara system. It is generally believed that the Mīmāmsakas and specially the Prābhākaras are atheists. But the source books of the Prābhākara School state in unequivocal terms that the inferential existence of God which is propounded by Naiyayikas and the like is denied by the Prābhākaras and that God is not denied: “īśvarē parōktmanumānaṁ nirastam, nēśvarō nirastaḥ”

Śālikanātha wrote Ṛjuvimalāpañcikā and Dīpaśikhāpañcikā commentaries on Prabhākara in the 8th century.

== Sentence vs word meaning ==
=== Prabhakara View ===
One of the views of the Prābhākaras posits that words do not directly designate meaning; any meaning that arises is because it is connected with other words (referred to as anvita-abhidhāna, where 'anvita' signifies connection and 'abhidhāna' denotes denotation). The comprehension of a word's meaning occurs only through the examination of its sentential context. In this paradigm, the understanding of word meanings involves an understanding of their possible semantic connections with other words. Notably, sentence meanings are directly grasped through perceptual and contextual cues, bypassing the stage of isolated individual word meanings (Matilal 1990:108).

This is very similar to the modern view of linguistic underspecification, and relates to the dynamic turn in semantics, which opposes the purely compositional view of arriving at sentence meaning.

=== Bhatta View ===
The Prābhākarakas were opposed by the Bhāṭṭas, who argued for a compositional view of semantics (called abhihitānvaya). In this view, the meaning of a sentence was understood only after understanding first the meanings of individual words. Words were independent, complete objects, a view that is close to the Fodorian view of language.

Of the two principal schools of the Pūrvamīmāmsā the Bhatta school has all along attracted greater attention than the Prabhakara school. The study of the works of the Prabhakara school has been neglected for a long time past. All the knowledge that our old Sanskrit scholars had of the tenets of this school was derived solely from the stray references found in the works of the other systems. At the wake of 20th century, Dr. Ganganath Jha has written a very learned thesis in which he has presented in a lucid form the main principles of the Prabhakara school as they have been dealt with in the Prakaraṇapancika of Śālikanātha. He has also given for the first time, much valuable information regarding the Bṛhatī of Prabhākara which is a commentary on Śabara’s Bhāṣya.

== Tradition and research ==
Tradition makes Prabhākara a pupil of Kumārila who nicknamed him as Guru on account of his great intellectual powers. But some scholars like Dr. Ganganatha Jha believe that the Prābhākara School is older and seems to be nearer to the spirit of the original Mīmāmsā. Dr. Keith (Karmamimamsa, 1921), who likewise rejects the current view in regard to the synchronism of the two authors and their mutual relation, assigns Prabhākara to 600-650 A.D. (Gopinath Kaviraj in Jha's Tantravarttika, 1924) According to the view of Dr. Ganganath Jha, the Prabhākara is more faithful to the Bhāṣya of Śabara than Kumārila. Also, according to Professor M. Hiriyanna, the original teaching of the Mīmāmsa is better preserved in the writings of Prabhākara than in those of Kumārila. As rightly observed by Dr. G. P. Bhatt, Prabhākara, however, was a more original thinker than Kumārila and he will always be remembered as the author of a peculiar theory of knowledge known as Theory of Triple perception Triputīpratyakṣavāda) and a theory of error called the Akhyātivāda or the Vivekākhyātivāda. In order to understand the system of Mīmāmsa fully and precisely, one must go through the works of the Prabhakara system. Pt. S. Subrahmanya Sāstri maintains the view that though many theories of this system are criticized in other systems particularly in the Nyaya the Prābhākara school commands respect from and is actually made use of by reputed scholars. The Viśiṣṭādvaita School of philosophy follows the Prābhākara School in matters regarding the categories of the world. It may be said that the study of the Prābhākara Mīmāmsa is necessary for acquiring a clear knowledge of the Dharma Śāstras and the Sāyaṇabhāṣya of the Vedas as well.

== Logic from Mīmāmsa rules ==
Translating Prabhakara's philosophical arguments into mathematical formula has revealed that his logic is error-free. One logical argument Prabhakara utilized was to reconcile a seeming contradiction in the Vedas between performing a sacrifice to kill one's enemies and following the rule of not harming any living beings. Translating his argument into math led to the settlement of an old philosophical dispute.

== See also ==
- Triputipratyaksavada (Prabhakara's Doctrine of Triple Perception)
- Khyativada
