= Apauruṣeyā =

Term used to describe the Vedas, the earliest scripture in Hinduism, meaning 'superhuman'

Apaurusheya (Sanskrit: अपौरुषेय, apauruṣeya, lit. means "not of man"), meaning "not of the authorship of man, of divine origin", is a term used to describe the Vedas, the earliest scripture in Hinduism. Poems in the Rigveda often have named authors, and so the idea of apaurusheya came about after the Rigveda was completed.

Apaurusheya shabda ("impersonal words, authorless") is an extension of apaurusheya which refers to the Vedas and numerous other texts in Hinduism. Apaurusheya is a central concept in the Vedanta and Mimamsa schools of Hindu philosophy. These schools accept the Vedas as svatah pramana ("self-evident means of knowledge"). The Mimamsa school asserts that since the Vedas are composed of words (shabda) and the words are composed of phonemes, the phonemes being eternal, the Vedas are also eternal. To this, if asked whether all words and sentences are eternal, the Mimamsa philosophers reply that the rules behind combination of phonemes are fixed and predetermined for the Vedas, unlike other words and sentences. The Vedanta school also accepts this line of argument.

== See also ==
- Sruti
- Revelation
- Shabda
