= Purandevi Mandir =

Bhagwati temple in Mithila

- पूरण देवी मंदिर
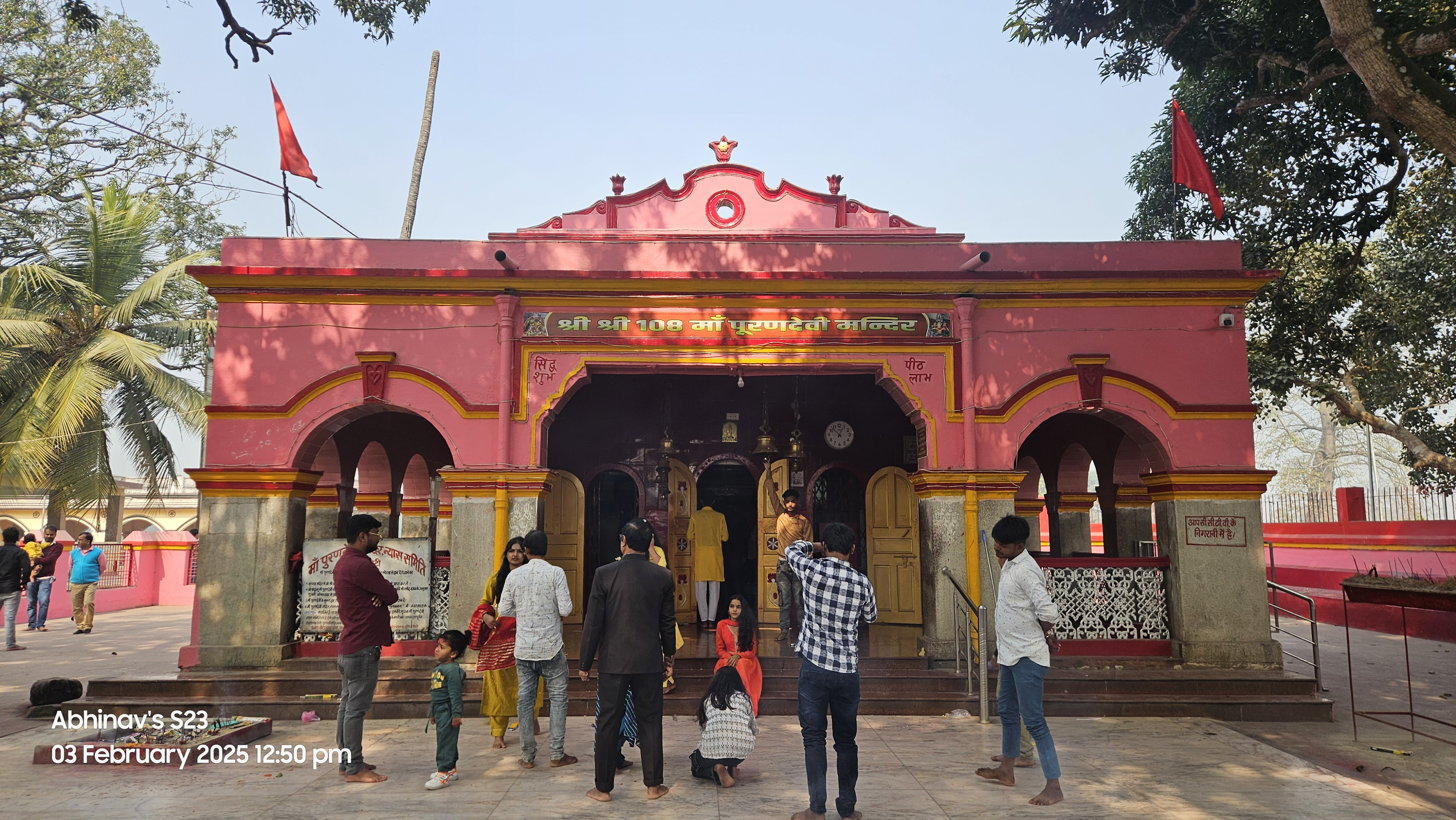
- View of Purandevi Mandir

Religion
- Affiliation: Hinduism
- District: Purnia
- Deity: Puran Devi

Location
- Location: Purnia
- State: Bihar
- Country: India
- Dedicated to ten Mahavidya of Goddess Bhagawati

Purandevi Mandir (Maithili: पूरण देवी मंदिर) is a Hindu shrine dedicated to Goddess Bhagwati in the Mithila region of the Indian subcontinent. It is considered as a Siddhapeeth Shakti shrine in the region. It is a legendary temple associated with Goddess Purandevi. It is located in the city of Purnia in Bihar, India. The Purandevi Mandir is the only temple in the country, which is believed to be the abode of all the ten Mahavidyas of the Goddess Bhagwati. The temple is popular for performing several sanskar rituals of marriage ceremonies, and mundan etc.
