= Dharmamoola =

River in the Mithila region

Dharmamoola ( Maithili: धर्ममूला ) is a river in the Mithila region of the Indian subcontinent. It originates from the Himalayan region in the subcontinent and flows on the plains of the Saharsa district in Bihar. It is an ancient river that is mentioned in Puranas. It has a separate existence like the other major rivers of Kosi and Ganga flowing through the Mithila region. The river is considered a holy river for Hindu adherents as of the holy river Ganga. It is also known for sacred bathing in the region. The people of this area take holy bath in this river and offer prayers on auspicious occasions and festivals. It is gradually sobbing on the banks of the Kosi river.

== Etymology ==
Dharmamoola is compound word having two Indic terms Dharma and Moola. In Hinduism, the term Dharma is translates to righteousness or broadly signifies to the religion. The literal meaning of the term moola is origin. Thus, the word Dharmamoola translates to the origin of righteousness or the religion. The presence of the religious and sacred sites on the bank of the river endorse the etymology of its the name.

== Description ==
The Dharmamoola river originates in the Himalayas of Nepal and flows in the Mithila region of Bihar in India. It divides into two streams at Chainsinghpatti of the Supaul district. The two streams have several names. Its eastern stream is known as Tilyuga, Dhemura and Dhemra. Similarly, its western stream is known as Purain and Manua. The river finally merge into the Kosi river at Koparia in the Saharsa district of Bihar.
