= Raj Rajeshwari Mandir =

Shaktipeetha in the Mithila region

- राज राजेश्वरी मंदिर

Religion
- Affiliation: Hinduism
- District: Madhubani
- Deity: Goddess Raj Rajeshwari

Location
- Location: Dokhar Sthan
- State: Bihar
- Country: India

Architecture
- Type: Tirhut style
- Founder: Pandit Rupi Upadhyaya; Mahesh Thakur
- Established: 9th century CE
- Completed: 13th-14th century CE

Raj Rajeshwari Mandir (Maithili: राजराजेश्वरी मंदिर) is a Hindu shrine dedicated to Raj Rajeshwari Bhagwati in the Mithila region of the Indian subcontinent. It is located at Dokahar Sthan near the Baharwan Belahi village of the Madhepur panchayat in the Kaluahi block of the Madhubani district in the state of Bihar in India. It is one of the Siddipeeth and Shaktipeeth in the region. The idol of the goddess in the temple is more than 1100 years old. The temple is situated near the bank of the Chandrabhaga river flowing through the village. According to the Hindu adherents, the location of the shrine is believed to be the playground of Adishakti and Devadhideva Mahadeva. Due to the legendary significance, the epithet name of the shrine in the region is also known as Tirth Raj. The present temple of the shrine was built by the King Mahesh Thakur of the Raj Darbhanga in Mithila.

== Legends ==
In the region, there is a popular legend related to the establishment of the temple. According to the legend, the temple was established 1100 years ago, after the legendary deity Raj Rajeshwari Devi came into the dream of the local priest named Pandit Rupi Upadhyaya. The priest was a resident of the Mahrail village in the Rajnagar block of the Madhubani district.

The legend says that in the dream of the priest, the legendary Goddess Raj Rajeshwari Devi appeared and she said "I am present in the Chandrabhaga river near the Dokhar village. Take me out of the river and install my idol." The next morning when the priest woke up, he gathered some local people and went to the legendary river with them for searching the idol. It is said that they found out the idol of the Goddess Raj Rajeshwari Devi from the river. After that the idol was installed on the bank of the river at the Dokhar village. The priest along with the local people started worship to the idol. Soon after that, a temple was established there.

== History ==
The initial temple was established during the period of the 9th century CE. Later, when Mahesh Thakur (13th-14th century CE) came to the temple for performing worship and darshan of the Goddess Raj Rajeshwari Devi, he was very influenced by the legend of the goddess. He later built the present structure of the temple.

=== Shilalekha ===
The temple holds an ancient inscription known as Shilalekha, at the entrance of the sanctum sanctorum of the temple. The information written in the inscription has yet not been understood by anyone. According to archeological scholars, the inscription may contains the history of the temple. Recently, an initiative has been started in the collaboration with some archeologists in region, to read the ancient inscriptions of the temple. The initiative has been aimed to collect the right and correct information related to the history and period of the temple.
