= Mahishi =

- Village
- Location in Bihar, India Mahishi (India)
- Coordinates (Mahishi): 25.8543767°N 86.4650201°E
- Country: India
- State: Bihar
- Region: Mithila
- District: Saharsa
- Elevation: 47.0 m (154.2 ft)

Population (2011)
  - Total: 19,073
- Time zone: UTC+05:30 (IST)
- PIN: 852216
- Telephone code: 06478
- ISO 3166 code: IN-BR
- Vehicle registration: BR
- Sex ratio: 900 females per 1000 males ♂/♀ ♂/♀
- Regional Language: Maithili
- Additional language: Hindi, English

Mahishi is a village situated in the Saharsa district of northern Bihar. It is 16 kilometers west of the Saharsa district headquarters and 8 kilometers west of Bangaon, Bihar. It is place of utmost religious importance due to Shaktipeeth of Goddess Ugratara. It is known as Ugratara Sthan. People of the village speak Maithili. The western Kosi embankment is only a few hundred meters away. It is situated near the bank of Dharmamoola river.

== See also ==
- List of villages of Saharsa
