= Maṇḍana Miśra =

8th century CE Indian philosopher

Mandana Mishra (Sanskrit: मण्डन मिश्र, romanized: Maṇḍana Miśra; c. 9th century CE) was an Indian Hindu philosopher who wrote on the Mīmāṃsā and Advaita systems of thought. He was a follower of the Karma Mimamsa school of philosophy and a staunch defender of the holistic sphota doctrine of language. He was a contemporary of Adi Shankara, and while it is said that he became a disciple of Adi Sankara, he seems to have been the most authoritative Advaitin until the 10th century CE. He is often identified with Sureśvara, though the authenticity of this is doubtful. Still, the official Sringeri documents recognises Mandana Mishra as Sureśvara.

== Works ==
Maṇḍana Miśhra, who was a contemporary of Shankara, is traditionally known to be a student of the Mimamsa scholar Kumarila Bhatta. He wrote several treatises on Mimamsa, but also a work on Advaita, the Brahmasiddhi (Sanskrit: ब्रह्मसिद्धि; literally, "realization of Brahman”). According to Thrasher, the Brahmasiddhi was Mandana's largest work, and the only one devoted wholly to Vedanta. His other works include the Mimamsa texts Bhāvanā-viveka, Vidhi-viveka, and Mīmāṃsānukramaṇikā, the Vibhrama-viveka, which treats theories of error, and the Sphota-siddhi, a work on philosophy of language.

It introduced the concept of anirvacaniyatva, the "inexpressibility of Maya-Avidya as existent or non-existent as identical or different from Brahman," a comon notion in Advaita which did not derive from Shankara. Maṇḍana Miśra argues that Avidya is neither the essence of Brahman, nor any other thing. It is neither absolutely non-existent, nor existent. So, it is called avidya (ignorance), maya (illusion), mithydvabhdsa (false appearance). He further argues that if it were the essence of a thing, whether distinct from it or not, it would be ultimately real, and so would not be ignorance. If it were absolutely non-existent, it would not be able to enter into practical action like the sky-flower. Hence it is inexpressible.

Another important concept in Brahmasiddhi is nirupdkhya, "indescribable". According to Mandana Mishra "real is describable but it does not mean all that is describable is fully real." According to him "the verbal knowledge of Brahman must be supplemented or transformed by direct knowledge, he nowhere said that Brahman is beyond words."

== Influence ==
Maṇḍana Miśhra probably was more influential in the Advaita Vedanta tradition than is usually acknowledged. According to Richard E. King,

Although it is common to find Western scholars and Hindus arguing that Sankaracarya was the most influential and important figure in the history of Hindu intellectual thought, this does not seem to be justified by the historical evidence.

According to King and Roodurmun, until the 10th century Sankara was overshadowed by his older contemporary Maṇḍana Miśhra. In the centuries after Sankara it was Maṇḍana Miśhra who was considered to be the most important representative of Vedanta. His influence was such, that some regard this work to have "set forth a non-Sankaran brand of Advaita." The "theory of error" set forth in the Brahma-siddhi became the normative Advaita Vedanta theory of error. According to Maṇḍana Miśhra, errors are opportunities because they "lead to truth", and full correct knowledge requires that not only should one understand the truth but also examine and understand errors as well as what is not truth.

His student Vachaspati Miśhra, who is believed to have been an incarnation of Shankara to popularize the Advaita view, wrote the Bhamati, a commentary on Shankara's Brahma Sutra Bhashya, and the Brahmatattva-samiksa, a commentary on Mandana Mishra's Brahma-siddhi. His thought was mainly inspired by Mandana Miśhra (he was described as Maṇḍana-pṛṣṭha-sevī, "the faithful follower of Mandana"), and harmonises Shankara's thought with that of Mandana Miśhra. (Note: The Bhamati and Vivarana Schools)

== Identification with Sureśvara ==
Maṇḍana Miśhra has often been identified with Sureśvara, based on the hagiographic Shankara Vijayams, which postdate Shankara by more than five centuries. The hagiographies are filled with legends and fiction, often mutually contradictory. Sureśvara (fl. 800-900 CE) and Maṇḍana Miśhra were contemporaries of Shankara. According to Advaita tradition, Maṇḍana Miśhra, originally a disciple of Kumarila Bhatta, started life as a Mīmāmsaka, became a sannyāsin and an Advaitin after he and his wife Ubhaya Bharati, were defeated by Shankara in a debate. He was given the yogapatta or monastic name Sureshwara. According to the Advaita Vedanta tradition, Suresvaracharya, along with Hastamalaka, Padmapāda, and Totakacharya was one of the four main disciples of Sankara, and was the first head of Sringeri Mutt, one of the four mathas believed in the Advaita Vedanta tradition to be established by Shankara.

According to Kuppuswami Sastri, it is unlikely that Maṇḍana Miśhra, the author of Brahmasiddhi, is identical to Sureśvara, but the tradition is correct in describing Maṇḍana Miśhra and Śankara as contemporaries. Sastri's critical edition of the Brahmasiddhi also notes that the name Maṇḍana Miśhra is both a title and a first name, which is a possible cause for a confusion of personalities. Maṇḍana Miśhra's brand of Advaita differs in certain critical details from that of Śhankara, whereas Sureśvara's thought is very faithful to that of Śhankara.

According to Sharma, Hiriyanna and Kuppuswami Sastra have pointed out that Sureśvara and Maṇḍana Miśra had different views on various doctrinal points:

- The locus of avidya: according to Maṇḍana Miśhra, the individual jiva is the locus of avidya, whereas Suresvara contends that avidya regarding Brahman is located in Brahman. These two different positions are also reflected in the opposing views of the Bhamati school and the Vivarana school.
- Liberation: according to Maṇḍana Miśhra, the knowledge which arises from the Mahavakya is insufficient for liberation. Only the direct realisation of Brahma is liberating, which can only be attained through meditation. According to Sureśvara, this knowledge is directly liberating, while meditation is at best a useful aid.

According to R. Balasubramanian there is no conclusive evidence available to identify Maṇḍana, the author of the Brahmasiddhi, with Sureśvara, the author of the Naiṣkarmyasiddhi and the Vārtikas, nor to reject this identification. (Note: Balasubramanian (1962, pp. 522, 532): "... we are not in a position to say either that the tradition about Mandana is perfectly reliable or that it should be thrown overboard [...] We can settle this question only if there is more definite evidence than we have at present in favour of either of the two views.")

== Sources ==
Printed sources

- Balasubramanian, R. (1962). "Identity of Maṇḍanamiśra". Journal of the American Oriental Society. 82 (4): 522–532. doi:10.2307/597522. JSTOR 597522.
- John Grimes, "Sureśvara" (in Robert L. Arrington [ed.]. A Companion to the Philosophers. Oxford: Blackwell, 2001. ISBN 0-631-22967-1)
- King, Richard (2002), Orientalism and Religion: Post-Colonial Theory, India and 'The Mystic East', Routledge
- Kuppuswami Sastri, S. (1984), Brahmasiddhi, by Maṇḍanamiśra, with commentary by Śankhapāṇī. 2nd ed., Delhi, India: Sri Satguru Publications
- Mayeda, Sengaku (2006). A thousand teachings : the Upadeśasāhasrī of Śaṅkara. Motilal Banarsidass. ISBN 978-81-208-2771-4.
- Pande, G. C. (2011). Life and Thought of Śaṅkarācārya. Motilal Banarsidass. ISBN 978-81-208-1104-1.
- Sarvepalli Radhakrishnan, et al. [edd], History of Philosophy Eastern and Western: Volume One (George Allen & Unwin, 1952)
- Roodurmun, Pulasth Soobah (2002), Bhāmatī and Vivaraṇa Schools of Advaita Vedānta: A Critical Approach, Delhi: Motilal Banarsidass Publishers Private Limited
- Sharma, C. (1997). Indian Philosophy: A Critical Survey. Motilal Banarsidass. ISBN 978-81-208-0365-7.
- Thrasher, Allen Wright (1993). The Advaita vedanta of Brahma-Siddhi. Motilall Banarsidass.

Web-sources

Preceded by Śankāra	Jagadguru of Sringeri Sharada Peetham; 820–834	Succeeded by Nityabodaghana
