= Kumārila Bhaṭṭa =

Hindu 8th century philosopher and scholar

- Born: est. 700 AD

Philosophical work
- Era: Hindu Indian philosophy
- Main interests: Mimamsa

Kumarila Bhatta (IAST: Kumārila Bhaṭṭa; fl. roughly 7th century CE) was a Hindu philosopher and a scholar of Mimamsa school of philosophy from early medieval India. He wrote three subcommentaries on Sabara's commentary on Jaimini's Purva Mimamsa Sutras, namely the Ślokavārttika, Tantravarttika and Tuptika. Bhaṭṭa was a staunch believer in the supreme validity of Vedic injunction, a champion of Pūrva-Mīmāṃsā and a confirmed ritualist. His philosophy is classified by some scholars as existential realism.

Kumārila is also credited with the logical formulation of the Mimamsic belief that the Vedas are unauthored (apauruṣeyā). In particular, he is known for his defense of Vedic ritualism against medieval Buddhist idealism. His work strongly influenced other schools of Indian philosophy, with the exception that while Mimamsa considers the Upanishads to be subservient to the Vedas, the Vedanta school does not think so.

== Early life ==
The birthplace of Kumārila Bhatta is uncertain. According to the 16th-century Buddhist scholar Taranatha, Kumārila was a native of South India. However, Anandagiri's Shankara-Vijaya states that Kumarila came from "the North" (udagdeśāt), and debated the Buddhists and the Jains in the South.

Another theory is that he came from eastern India, specifically Kamarupa (present-day Assam). Sesa's Sarvasiddhanta-rahasya uses the eastern title Bhattacharya for him. His writings indicate that he was familiar with the production of silk, which was common in present-day Assam. Yet another theory is that he comes from Mithila, which has similar culture to Assam, and produced another scholar on the subject Mandana Misra. According to legend in Mithila, the Kumarila Bhatta Dih at Bhatsimar or Bhatpura in the Mithila region is believed to be the birthplace of Kumarila Bhatta.

== Philosophy of Language ==
Kumārila Bhaṭṭa and his followers in the Mīmāṃsā tradition known as Bhāṭṭas argued for a strongly Compositional view of semantics called abhihitānvaya or "designation of what has been denoted." In this view, the meaning of a sentence was understood only after understanding first the meanings of individual words. Word referents were independent, complete objects, a view that is close to the Fodorian view of language, according to philosopher Daniel Arnold. He also used several Tamil words in his works, including one of the earliest mention of the name Dravida in North Indian sources, found in his Tantravārttika.

The above-mentioned view of sentence meaning was debated over some seven or eight centuries by the followers of the Prabhākara school within Mīmāṃsā, who argued that words do not directly designate meaning. Rather, word meanings are understood as already connected with other words (anvitābhidhāna, anvita = connected; abhidhāna = denotation). This view was influenced by the holistic arguments of Bhartṛhari's sphoṭa theory. Essentially the Prābhākaras argued that sentence meanings are grasped directly, from perceptual and contextual cues, skipping the stage of grasping singly the individual word meanings, similar to the modern view of linguistic underspecification, which relates to the dynamic turn in semantics, that also opposes purely compositional approaches to sentence meaning.

== Epistemology ==
Kumārila's advocates for the doctrine of intrinsic validity, also known as svatah pramanya. In this view, all cognitions are valid at the moment of apprehension unless and until proved otherwise. John Taber argues that this is distinct from coherence theories of truth.

In his text Slokavarttika, Kumārila Bhatta argues that cognitions are intrinsically valid (svatah pramanya):

It should be understood that all pramanas' have the property of being pramanas intrinsically; for a capacity not already existing by itself (svatah) cannot be produced by anything else.

Kumārila argues against the need for second-order justification before accepting cognitions as valid.

== Theism ==
Whilst taking an āstika position, that is, a position in which the supremacy of the Veda is upheld, Kumārila, in line with the Mimamsa tradition, rejects the notion of a supreme deity or God. Within his commentaries, Kumārila provides various kinds of arguments to reject the notion of a God. One such argument is his skepticism towards a cosmological argument in favour of a divine transcendent creator. In his Slokavarttika, Kumārila argues that it is implausible to accept both that the world had a divine creator and that the world had any kind of 'beginning' to begin with. Following from this Kumārila considers two options, either the deity that created the world has a created body or an uncreated body. If the deity has a created body then there would be an infinite regress, since we would then need to ask, who created the body of the creator? If the deity has an uncreated body, a body that has always existed, why can we not say the same for our own?

== Critical Engagement with Buddhism ==
Kumārila Bhaṭṭa is known for his defense of Vedic ritualism against medieval Buddhist idealism. With the aim to prove the superiority of Vedic scripture, Kumārila Bhaṭṭa presented several novel arguments:

1. Buddhist texts were written in vernacular and not Sanskrit. Sheldon Pollock demonstrates that one of the ways that Kumārila rejects the validity of Buddhist texts is by critiquing the language through which it is transmitted. He specifically takes the Buddhist verse: 'ime samkhada dhamma sambhavanti sakarana akarana vinassanti' (These phenomena arise when the cause is present and perish when the cause is absent). Thus he presents his argument:

The scriptures of Buddhists and Jains are composed in overwhelmingly incorrect (asadhu) language, words of the Magadha or Dakshinatya languages, or even their dialects (tadopabhramsa). Therefore false compositions (asannibandhana), they cannot possibly be true knowledge (shastra) ... By contrast, the very form itself (the well-assembled language) of the Veda proves its authority to be independent and absolute.

Pollock, however, notes that this argument reveals that Kumārila was ignorant of the Buddhist texts written in Sanskrit that were already available during his time.

2. Every extant school held some scripture to be correct. To show that the Veda was the only correct scripture, Kumārila said that "the absence of an author would safeguard the Veda against all reproach" (apaurusheya). There was "no way to prove any of the contents of Buddhist scriptures directly as wrong in spirit...", unless one challenges the legitimacy and eternal nature of the scripture itself. It is well known that the Pali Canon was composed after the Buddha's parinirvana. Further, even if they were the Buddha's words, they were not eternal or unauthored like the Vedas.

3. The Sautrantika Buddhist school believed that the universe was momentary (kshanika). Kumārila said that this was absurd, given that the universe does not disappear every moment. No matter how small one would define the duration of a moment, one could divide the moment into infinitely further parts. Kumārila argues: "if the universe does not exist between moments, then in which of these moments does it exist?" Because a moment could be infinitesimally small, Bhaṭṭa argued that the Buddhist was claiming that the universe was non-existent.

4. The Determination of perception (pratyaksha pariccheda).

=== Kumarila and Dharmakirti ===
According to Buton Rinchen Drub, Kumārila spoke abusively towards his nephew, Dharmakīrti, as he was taking his brahminical garments. This drove Dharmakīrti away, and resolving to vanquish all non-Buddhist heretics he took the robes of the Buddhist order instead.

John Taber, through an analysis of Kumārila's arguments in the Ślokavārttika, argues that Kumārila could not have been engaging with Dharmakirti since his portrayal of Buddhist arguments is less sophisticated than what Dharmakirti argued. Kumārila has in mind a Buddhist opponent whose arguments are more sophisticated than Dignaga's but less sophisticated than Dharmakirti. This analysis challenges the idea that Kumārila was acquainted with Dharmakirti and his works.

== Legendary life ==
According to legend, Kumārila went to study Buddhism at Nalanda (the largest 4th-century university in the world), with the aim of refuting Buddhist doctrine in favour of Vedic religion. He was expelled from the university when he protested against his teacher (Dharmakirti) ridiculing the Vedic rituals. Legend has it that even though he was thrown off of the university's tower, he survived with an eye injury by claiming "if the Vedas are the ultimate then I will be spared from Death."

The Madhaviya Sankara Digvijayam, a 14th-century hagiographic work on the life of Sankara, claims that Sankara challenged Bhaṭṭa to a debate on his deathbed. Kumārila Bhaṭṭa could not debate Sankara as he was punishing himself to have disrespected his Buddhist teacher by defeating him in a debate using the Vedas by self-immolation at the banks of Ganga at Prayagraj and instead directed him to argue with his student Mandana Misra in Mahiṣmati. He said:

You will find a home at whose gates there are a number of caged parrots discussing abstract topics like — 'Do the Vedas have self-validity or do they depend on some external authority for their validity? Are karmas capable of yielding their fruits directly, or do they require the intervention of God to do so? Is the world eternal, or is it a mere appearance?' Where you find the caged parrots discussing such abstruse philosophical problems, you will know that you have reached Maṇḍana's place.

Kumarila's importance in the history of Indian philosophy comes to light in view of how his work has been extensively quoted.

== Works ==
- Slokavartika ("Exposition on the Verses", commentary on Shabara's Commentary on Jaimini's Mimamsa Sutras, Bk. 1, Ch. 1)
- Tantravartika ("Exposition on the Sacred Sciences", commentary on Shabara's Commentary on Jaimini's Mimamsa Sutras, Bk. 1, Ch. 2–4 and Bks. 2–3)
- Tuptika ("Full Exposition" commentary on Shabara's Commentary on Jaimini's Mimamsa Sutras, Bks. 4–9)

== Sources ==
- Arnold, Daniel Anderson. Buddhists, Brahmins, and Belief: Epistemology in South Asian Philosophy of Religion. Columbia University Press, 2005. ISBN 978-0-231-13281-7.
- Bales, Eugene (1987). A Ready Reference to Philosophy East and West. University Press of America. p. 201. ISBN 9780819166401. "Buddhist philosophy as presented in Mimamsa Sloka Vartika."
- Bhatt, Govardhan P. The Basic Ways of Knowing: An In-depth Study of Kumārila's Contribution to Indian Epistemology. Delhi: Motilal Banarasidass, 1989. ISBN 81-208-0580-1.
- Kumarila Bhatta, Translated by Ganganatha Jha (1985). Slokavarttika. The Asiatic Society, Calcutta.
- Bimal Krishna Matilal (1990). The word and the world: India's contribution to the study of language. Oxford.
- Long, Jeffery D. (2011), Historical Dictionary of Hinduism, Scarecrow Press
- Vijaya Rani (1982). Buddhist Philosophy as Presented in Mimamsa Sloka Varttika. 1st Ed. Parimal Publications, Delhi ASIN B0006ECAEO.
- Sheldon Pollock (2006). The Language of the Gods in the World of Men – Sanskrit, Culture and Power in Premodern India. University of California Press.
- Sharma, Peri Sarveswara (1980). Anthology of Kumārilabhaṭṭa's Works. Delhi, Motilal Banarsidass.
- Sheridan, Daniel P. (1995), "Kumarila Bhatta", in McGready, Ian (ed.), Great Thinkers of the Eastern World, New York: Harper Collins, ISBN 0-06-270085-5
- Translated and commentary by John Taber (January 2005). A Hindu Critique of Buddhist Epistemology. Routledge. ISBN 978-0-415-33602-4.
