= Mīmāṃsā =

One of six orthodox schools of Hindu philosophy

Mīmāṁsā (Sanskrit: मीमांसा; IAST: Mīmāṁsā) is a Sanskrit word that means "reflection" or "critical investigation" and thus refers to a tradition of contemplation which reflected on the meanings of certain Vedic texts. This tradition is also known as Pūrva-Mīmāṁsā because of its focus on the earlier (pūrva) Vedic texts dealing with ritual actions, and similarly as Karma-Mīmāṁsā due to its focus on ritual action (karma). It is one of six Vedic "affirming" (āstika) schools of Hindu philosophy. This particular school is known for its philosophical theories on the nature of Dharma, based on hermeneutics of the Vedas, especially the Brāḥmanas and samhitas. The Mīmāṃsā school was foundational and influential for the Vedāntic schools, which were also known as Uttara-Mīmāṁsā for their focus on the "later" (uttara) portions of the Vedas, the Upanishads. While both "earlier" and "later" Mīmāṁsā investigate the aim of human action, they do so with different attitudes towards the necessity of ritual praxis.

Mīmāṁsā has several sub-schools, each defined by its pramana. The Prabhākara sub-school, which takes its name from the seventh-century philosopher Prabhākara, described the five epistemically reliable means to gaining knowledge: pratyakṣa or perception; anumāna or inference; upamāṇa, comparison and analogy; arthāpatti, the use of postulation and derivation from circumstances; and shabda, the word or testimony of past or present reliable experts. The Bhāṭṭa sub-school, from philosopher Kumārila Bhaṭṭa, added a sixth means to its canon; anupalabdhi meant non-perception, or proof by the absence of cognition (e.g., the lack of gunpowder on a suspect's hand).

The school of Mīmāṁsā consists of both non-theistic and theistic doctrines, but the school showed little interest in systematic examination of the existence of Gods. Rather, it held that the soul is an eternal, omnipresent, inherently active spiritual essence, and focused on the epistemology and metaphysics of Dharma. For the Mīmāṁsā school, Dharma meant rituals and social duties, not Devas, or Gods, because Gods existed only in name. The Mīmāṃsakas also held that Vedas are "eternal, author-less, [and] infallible", that Vedic vidhi, or injunctions and mantras in rituals are prescriptive kārya or actions, and the rituals are of primary importance and merit. They considered the Upaniṣads and other texts related to self-knowledge and spirituality as subsidiary, a philosophical view that Vedānta disagreed with.

While their deep analysis of language and linguistics influenced other schools of Hinduism, their views were not shared by others. Mīmāṁsakas considered the purpose and power of language was to clearly prescribe the proper, correct and right. In contrast, Vedāntins extended the scope and value of language as a tool to also describe, develop and derive. Mīmāṁsakās considered orderly, law-driven, procedural life as the central purpose and noblest necessity of Dharma and society, and divine (theistic) sustenance means to that end.

The Mīmāṁsā school is a form of philosophical realism. A key text of the Mīmāṁsā school is the Mīmāṁsā Sūtra of Jaimini.

== Terminology ==
Mīmāṁsā (IAST), also romanized Mimansa or Mimamsa, means "reflection, consideration, profound thought, investigation, examination, discussion" in Sanskrit. It also refers to the "examination of the Vedic text" and to a school of Hindu philosophy that is also known as Pūrva Mīmāṁsā ("prior" inquiry, also Karma-Mīmāṁsā), in contrast to Uttara Mīmāṁsā ("posterior" inquiry, also Jñāna-Mīmāṁsā) – the opposing school of Vedanta. This division is based on classification of the Vedic texts into karmakāṇḍa, the early sections of the Veda treating of mantras and rituals (Samhitas and Brahmanas), and the jñānakāṇḍa dealing with the meditation, reflection and knowledge of Self, Oneness, Brahman (the Upaniṣads). Between the Samhitas and Brahmanas, the Mīmāṁsā school places greater emphasis on the Brahmanas – the part of Vedas that is a commentary on Vedic rituals.

The word comes from the desiderative stem of √man (Macdonell, A. A, 1883, A Sanskrit-English Dictionary), from Proto-Indo-European *men- (“to think”). Donald Davis translates Mīmāṁsā as the "desire to think", and in colloquial historical context as "how to think and interpret things". In the last centuries of the first millennium BCE, the word Mīmāṁsā began to denote the thoughts on and interpretation of the Vedas, first as Pūrva-Mīmāṁsā for rituals portions in the earlier layers of texts in the Vedas, and as Uttara-Mīmāṁsā for the philosophical portions in the last layers. Over time, Pūrva-Mīmāṁsā was just known as the Mīmāṁsā school, and the Uttara-Mīmāṁsā as the Vedanta school.

Mīmāṁsā scholars are referred to as Mīmāṁsākas.

== Development ==
=== Foundational text ===
The foundational text for the Mīmāṁsā school is the Purva Mīmāṁsā Sutras of Jaimini (c. 3rd to 2nd century BCE). However, Anthony Kennedy Warder notes that Mīmāṃsā, as a direct continuation of archaic Vedic ritualism, and Saṁkhya had most definitely already started taking shape prior to the systematic emergence of other orthodox and heterodox schools of Indian philosophy in the mid-1st millennium BCE. The Mīmāṁsā Sūtras explicitly aim to establish the correct way to interpret the Vedas.

=== Commentarial tradition ===
Śabara is the first commentator of the Mīmāṁsā Sūtra, whose work is extant. His bhāṣya (commentary) is the basis of all later works of Mīmāṁsā. The commentaries on the Mīmāṁsā Sūtra by Bhartṛmitra, Bhavadāsa, Hari, and Upavarṣa are no longer extant.

Kumārila Bhaṭṭa, Mandana Miśra, Pārthasārathi Miśra, Sucarita Miśra, Ramakrishna Bhatta, Madhava Subhodini, Sankara Bhatta, Krsnayajvan, Anantadeva, Gaga Bhatta, Ragavendra Tirtha, Vijayindra Tirtha, Appayya Dikshitar, Paruthiyur Krishna Sastri, Mahomahapadyaya Sri Ramsubba Sastri, Sri Venkatsubba Sastri, Sri A. Chinnaswami Sastri, and Sengalipuram Vaidhyanatha Dikshitar were scholars of Mīmāṁsā. The school reached its height with Kumārila Bhaṭṭa and Prabhākara (fl. ca. 700 CE).

Kumārila Bhaṭṭa (7th century CE), the founder of the first school of Mīmāṁsā, commented on both the Mīmāṁsā Sūtra and its Śabara Bhāṣya. His treatise consists of 3 parts, the Ślokavārttika, the Tantravārttika, and the Ṭupṭīkā. Maṇdana Miśra (8th century CE) was a follower of Kumārila who wrote the Vidhiviveka and the Mīmāṁsānukramaṇī. There are several commentaries on the works of Kumārila. Sucarita Miśra wrote a Kāśikā (commentary) on the Ślokavārttika. Someśvara Bhaṭṭa wrote the Nyāyasudhā, also known as the Rāṇaka, a commentary on the Tantravārttika. Pārthasārathi Miśra wrote the Nyāyaratnākara (1300 CE), another commentary on the Ślokavārttika. He also wrote the Śāstradīpikā, an independent work on Mīmāṁsā, and the Tantraratna. Veṅkaṭa Dīkṣita's Vārttikabharaṇya is a commentary on the Ṭupṭīkā.

Prabhākara (8th century CE), the originator of the second school of Mīmāṁsā, wrote his commentary Bṛhatī on the Śabara Bhāṣya. Śālikanātha's Ṛjuvimalā (9th century CE) is a commentary on the Bṛhatī. His Prakaraṇapañcikā is an independent work of this school and the Pariśiṣṭa is a brief explanation of the Śabara Bhāṣya. Bhavanātha's Nyāyaviveka deals with the views of this school in detail.

The founder of the third school of Mīmāṁsā was Murāri, whose works have not reached us.

Āpadeva (17th century) wrote an elementary work on Mīmāṁsā, known as Mīmāṁsānyāyaprakaśa or Āpadevī. The Arthasaṁgraha of Laugākṣi Bhāskara is based on the Āpadevī. Vedānta Deśika's Śeśvara Mīmāṁsā was an attempt to combine the views of the Mīmāṁsā and Vedānta schools.

== Darśana (philosophy) – central concerns ==
Mīmāṁsā is one of the six classical Hindu darśanas. It is among the earliest schools of Hindu philosophies. It has attracted relatively less scholarly study, although its theories and particularly its questions on exegesis and theology have been highly influential on all classical Indian philosophies. Its analysis of language has been of central importance to the legal literature of India.

Ancient Mīmāṁsā's central concern was epistemology (pramana), that is what are the reliable means to knowledge. It debated not only "how does man ever learn or know, whatever he knows", but also whether the nature of all knowledge is inherently circular, whether those such as foundationalists who critique the validity of any "justified beliefs" and knowledge system make flawed presumptions of the very premises they critique, and how to correctly interpret and avoid incorrectly interpreting dharma texts such as the Vedas. It asked questions such as "what is devata (god)?", "are rituals dedicated to devatas efficacious?", "what makes anything efficacious?", and "Can it be proved that the Vedas, or any canonical text in any system of thought, is fallible or infallible (svatah pramanya, intrinsically valid)? If so, how?" and others. To Mīmāṁsā scholars, the nature of non-empirical knowledge and human means to it are such that one can never demonstrate certainty, one can only falsify knowledge claims, in some cases. According to Francis Clooney, the Mīmāṁsā school is "one of the most distinctively Hindu forms of thinking; it is without real parallel elsewhere in the world".

The central text of the Mīmāṁsā school is Jamini's Mīmāṁsā Sutras, accompanied by the historically influential commentary of Sabara (Śabarabhāṣya) and Kumarila Bhatta's commentary (Ślokavārttika) on Sabara's commentary. Together, these texts develop and apply the rules of language analysis (such as the rules of contradiction), asserting that one must not only examine injunctive propositions in any scripture but also examine the alternate related or reverse propositions for better understanding. They suggested that to reach correct and valid knowledge it is not only sufficient to demand proof of a proposition, it is important to give proof of a proposition's negative as well as declare and prove one's preferred propositions. Further, they asserted that whenever perception is not the means of direct proof and knowledge, one cannot prove such non-empirical propositions to be "true or not true", rather one can only prove a non-empirical proposition is "false, not false, or uncertain".

For example, Mīmāṁsakas welcome not only the demand for proof of an injunctive proposition such as "agnihotra ritual leads one to heaven", but suggest that one must examine and prove alternate propositions such as "ritual does not lead one to heaven", "something else leads one to heaven", "there is heaven", "there is no heaven" and so on. Mīmāṁsā literature states that if satisfactory, verifiable proof for all of such propositions cannot be found by its proponents and its opponents, then the proposition needs to be accepted as a part of a "belief system". Beliefs, such as those in the scriptures (Vedas), must be accepted to be true unless its opponents can demonstrate the proof of the validity of their own texts or teacher(s) these opponents presume to be prima facie justified, and until these opponents can demonstrate that the scriptures they challenge are false. If they do not try to do so, it is hypocrisy; if they try to do so, it can only lead to an infinite regress, according to Mīmānsākas. Any historic scripture with widespread social acceptance, according to Mīmāṁsāka, is an activity of communication (vyavahārapravṛtti) and is accepted as authoritative because it is socially validated practice unless perceptually verifiable evidence emerges that proves parts or all of it as false or harmful.

Mīmāṁsākas were predominantly concerned with the central motivation of human beings, the highest good, and actions that make this possible. They stated that human beings seek niratisaya priti (unending ecstatic pleasure, joy, happiness) in this life and the next. They argued that this highest good is the result of one's own ethical actions (dharma), that such actions are what the Vedic sentences contain and communicate, and therefore it is important to properly interpret and understand Vedic sentences, words and meaning. Mīmāṁsā scholarship was centrally concerned with the philosophy of language, how human beings learn and communicate with each other and across generations with language in order to act in a manner that enables them to achieve that which motivates them. The Mīmāṁsā school focussed on dharma, deriving ethics and activity from the karma-kanda (rituals) part of the Vedas, with the argument that ethics for this life and efficacious action for svarga (heaven) cannot be derived from sense-perception, and can only be derived from experience, reflection and understanding of past teachings.

In every human activity, the motivating force to perform an action is his innate longing for priti (pleasure, happiness),
whether at the lowest level or the highest level.
At the highest level, it is nothing but an unsurpassed state of priti,
which is ensured only by performing ethical actions.

– Sabara, 2nd century Mīmānsā scholar

According to Daniel Arnold, Mīmāṁsā scholarship has "striking affinities" with that of William Alston, the 20th century Western philosopher, along with some notable differences. The Mīmāṁsākas subjected to a radical critique, more than two thousand years ago, states Francis Clooney, the notions such as "God," the "sacred text," the "author" and the "anthropocentric ordering of reality".

== Epistemology ==
In the realm of epistemological studies, subsequent Mīmāṃsākas scholars have made significant contributions. Unlike the Nyaya or the Vaisheshika systems, the Prābhākara branch of Mīmāṃsā recognizes five means of valid knowledge (Skt. pramāṇa). In addition to these, the Bhāṭṭa sub-school of Mīmāṃsā acknowledges a sixth means, namely anuapalabdhi, akin to the Advaita Vedanta school of Hinduism. The following are the six epistemically reliable means of gaining knowledge:

=== Pratyaksa ===
Pratyakṣa (प्रत्यक्ष means perception. It is of two types in Mīmāṁsā and other schools of Hinduism: external and internal. External perception is described as that arising from the interaction of five senses and worldly objects, while internal perception is described by this school as that of inner sense, the mind. The ancient and medieval Indian texts identify four requirements for correct perception: Indriyarthasannikarsa (direct experience by one's sensory organ(s) with the object, whatever is being studied), Avyapadesya (non-verbal; correct perception is not through hearsay, according to ancient Indian scholars, where one's sensory organ relies on accepting or rejecting someone else's perception), Avyabhicara (does not wander; correct perception does not change, nor is it the result of deception because one's sensory organ or means of observation is drifting, defective, suspect) and Vyavasayatmaka (definite; correct perception excludes judgments of doubt, either because of one's failure to observe all the details, or because one is mixing inference with observation and observing what one wants to observe, or not observing what one does not want to observe). Some ancient scholars proposed "unusual perception" as pramana and called it internal perception, a proposal contested by other Indian scholars. The internal perception concepts included pratibha (intuition), samanyalaksanapratyaksa (a form of induction from perceived specifics to a universal), and jnanalaksanapratyaksa (a form of perception of prior processes and previous states of a 'topic of study' by observing its current state). Further, some schools of Hinduism considered and refined rules of accepting uncertain knowledge from Pratyakṣa-pramana, so as to contrast nirnaya (definite judgment, conclusion) from anadhyavasaya (indefinite judgment).

=== Anumana ===
Anumāna (अनुमान) means inference. It is described as reaching a new conclusion and truth from one or more observations and previous truths by applying reason. Observing smoke and inferring fire is an example of Anumana. In all except one Hindu philosophies, this is a valid and useful means to knowledge. The method of inference is explained by Indian texts as consisting of three parts: pratijna (hypothesis), hetu (a reason), and drshtanta (examples). The hypothesis must further be broken down into two parts, state the ancient Indian scholars: sadhya (that idea which needs to proven or disproven) and paksha (the object on which the sadhya is predicated). The inference is conditionally true if sapaksha (positive examples as evidence) are present, and if vipaksha (negative examples as counter-evidence) are absent. For rigor, the Indian philosophies also state further epistemic steps. For example, they demand Vyapti – the requirement that the hetu (reason) must necessarily and separately account for the inference in "all" cases, in both sapaksha and vipaksha. A conditionally proven hypothesis is called a nigamana (conclusion).

=== Upamana ===
Upamāna means comparison and analogy. Some Hindu schools consider it as a proper means of knowledge. Upamana, states Lochtefeld, may be explained with the example of a traveller who has never visited lands or islands with endemic population of wildlife. He or she is told, by someone who has been there, that in those lands you see an animal that sort of looks like a cow, grazes like a cow, but is different from a cow in such and such way. Such use of analogy and comparison is, state the Indian epistemologists, a valid means of conditional knowledge, as it helps the traveller identify the new animal later. The subject of comparison is formally called upameyam, the object of comparison is called upamanam, while the attribute(s) are identified as samanya. Thus, explains Monier Monier-Williams, if a boy says "her face is like the moon in charmingness", "her face" is upameyam, the moon is upamanam, and charmingness is samanya. The 7th century text Bhaṭṭikāvya in verses 10.28 through 10.63 discusses many types of comparisons and analogies, identifying when this epistemic method is more useful and reliable, and when it is not. In various ancient and medieval texts of Hinduism, 32 types of Upanama and their value in epistemology are debated.

=== Arthāpatti ===
Arthāpatti (अर्थापत्ति) means postulation, derivation from circumstances. In contemporary logic, this pramāṇa is similar to circumstantial implication. As example, if a person left in a boat on a river earlier, and the time is now past the expected time of arrival, then the circumstances support the truth postulate that the person has arrived. Many Indian scholars considered this pramāṇa as invalid or at best weak, because the boat may have gotten delayed or diverted. However, in cases such as deriving the time of a future sunrise or sunset, this method was asserted by the proponents to be reliable. Another common example for arthāpatti found in the texts of Mīmāṁsā and other schools of Hinduism is, that if "Devadatta is fat" and "Devadatta does not eat in the day", then the following must be true: "Devadatta eats in the night". This form of postulation and deriving from circumstances is, claim the Indian scholars, a means to discovery, proper insight and knowledge. The Hindu schools that accept this means of knowledge state that this method is a valid means to conditional knowledge and truths about a subject and object in original premises or different premises. The schools that do not accept this method, state that postulation, extrapolation and circumstantial implication is either derivable from other pramāṇas or flawed means to correct knowledge, instead one must rely on direct perception or proper inference.

=== Anupalabdhi ===
Anupalabdhi (अनुपलब्धि), accepted only by Kumarila Bhatta sub-school of Mīmāṁsā, means non-perception, negative/cognitive proof. Anupalabdhi pramana suggests that knowing a negative, such as "there is no jug in this room" is a form of valid knowledge. If something can be observed or inferred or proven as non-existent or impossible, then one knows more than what one did without such means. In the two schools of Hinduism that consider Anupalabdhi as epistemically valuable, a valid conclusion is either sadrupa (positive) or asadrupa (negative) relation – both correct and valuable. Like other pramana, Indian scholars refined Anupalabdi to four types: non-perception of the cause, non-perception of the effect, non-perception of object, and non-perception of contradiction. Only two schools of Hinduism accepted and developed the concept "non-perception" as a pramana. The schools that endorsed Anupalabdi affirmed that it as valid and useful when the other five pramanas fail in one's pursuit of knowledge and truth.

Abhava (अभव) means non-existence. Some scholars consider Anupalabdi to be same as Abhava, while others consider Anupalabdi and Abhava as different. Abhava-pramana has been discussed in ancient Hindu texts in the context of Padārtha (पदार्थ, referent of a term). A Padartha is defined as that which is simultaneously Astitva (existent), Jneyatva (knowable) and Abhidheyatva (nameable). Specific examples of padartha, states Bartley, include dravya (substance), guna (quality), karma (activity/motion), samanya/jati (universal/class property), samavaya (inherence) and vishesha (individuality). Abhava is then explained as "referents of negative expression" in contrast to "referents of positive expression" in Padartha. An absence, state the ancient scholars, is also "existent, knowable and nameable", giving the example of negative numbers, silence as a form of testimony, asatkaryavada theory of causation, and analysis of deficit as real and valuable. Abhava was further refined in four types, by the schools of Hinduism that accepted it as a useful method of epistemology: dhvaṁsa (termination of what existed), atyanta-abhava (impossibility, absolute non-existence, contradiction), anyonya-abhava (mutual negation, reciprocal absence) and pragavasa (prior, antecedent non-existence).

=== Shabda ===
Shabda (शब्द) means relying on word, testimony of past or present reliable experts. Hiriyanna explains Sabda-pramana as a concept which means reliable expert testimony. The schools of Hinduism which consider it epistemically valid suggest that a human being needs to know numerous facts, and with the limited time and energy available, he can learn only a fraction of those facts and truths directly. He must rely on others, his parent, family, friends, teachers, ancestors and kindred members of society to rapidly acquire and share knowledge and thereby enrich each other's lives. This means of gaining proper knowledge is either spoken or written, but through Sabda (words). The reliability of the source is important, and legitimate knowledge can only come from the Sabda of reliable sources. The disagreement between the schools of Hinduism has been on how to establish reliability. Some schools, such as Charvaka, state that this is never possible, and therefore Sabda is not a proper pramana. Other schools debate means to establish reliability. Mimamsa takes the relationship between a word and its meaning to be eternal. They believe there was not a starting point at which a human or God decided to connect X word with Y meaning.

=== Svatah Pramanya ===
The doctrine of svatah pramanya in Mīmāṁsā emphasizes accepting appearances as they are. It holds that since a cognition initially appears true, it should be accepted as true unless there is concrete evidence to the contrary. If no such evidence ever appears, the cognition is considered genuinely true.

=== Relation to Vedanta school ===
An interesting feature of the Mīmāṁsā school of philosophy is its unique epistemological theory of the intrinsic validity of all cognition as such. It is held that all knowledge is ipso facto true (Skt. svataḥ prāmāṇyavāda). Thus, what is to be proven is not the truth of a cognition, but its falsity. The Mīmāṁsākas advocate the self-validity of knowledge both in respect of its origin (utpatti) and ascertainment (jñapti). Not only did the Mīmāṃṁākas make a very great use of this theory to establish the unchallengeable validity of the Vedas, but later Vedantists also drew freely upon this particular Mīmāṁsā contribution.

== Metaphysics and beliefs ==
The core tenets of Pūrva Mīmāṁsā are ritualism (orthopraxy) and anti-asceticism. The central aim of the school is elucidation of the nature of dharma, understood as a set ritual obligations and prerogatives to be performed properly.

=== Apaurusheya ===
The term Apaurusheya, central to the Mīmāṁsā school, asserts that the Vedas are not of human origin. Instead, they are considered uncreated, without any specific author, and self-validating in their authority. Jaimini explains in his fifth Mīmāṁsā Sutra that the relationship between words and their meanings in the Vedas is primordial, meaning it has existed since the beginning of time.

=== Non-theism ===
Mīmāṁsā theorists decided that the evidence allegedly proving the existence of God was insufficient. They argue that there was no need to postulate a maker for the world, just as there was no need for an author to compose the Vedas or a God to validate the rituals. Mīmāṃsā argues that the Gods named in the Vedas have no existence apart from the mantras that speak their names. To that regard, the power of the mantras is what is seen as the power of Gods.

=== Dharma ===
Dharma as understood by Pūrva Mīmāṁsā can be loosely translated into English as "virtue", "morality" or "duty". The Pūrva Mīmāṁsā school traces the source of the knowledge of dharma neither to sense-experience nor inference, but to verbal cognition (i.e. knowledge of words and meanings) according to Vedas. In this respect it is related to the Nyāya school, the latter, however, accepts only four sources of knowledge (pramāṇa) as valid.

The Pūrva Mīmāṁsā school held dharma to be equivalent to following the prescriptions of the Saṁhitās and their Brāhmaṇa commentaries relating the correct performance of Vedic rituals. Seen in this light, Pūrva Mīmāṁsā is essentially ritualist (orthopraxy), placing great weight on the performance of karma or action as enjoined by the Vedas.

=== Relation to Vedānta ===
Emphasis of Yajnic Karmakāṇḍas in Pūrva Mīmāṁsā is erroneously interpreted by some to be an opposition to Jñānakāṇḍa of Vedānta and Upaniṣads. Pūrva Mīmāṁsā does not discuss topics related to Jñānakāṇḍa, such as salvation (mokṣa), but it never speaks against mokṣa. Vedānta quotes Jaimini's belief in Brahman as well as in mokṣa:

In Uttara-Mīmāṁsā or Vedānta (4.4.5–7), Bāḍarāyaṇa cites Jaimini as saying (ब्राह्मेण जैमिनिरूपन्यासादिभ्यः) "(The mukta Puruṣa is united with the Brahman) as if it were like the Brahman, because descriptions (in Śruti etc) prove so".

In Vedānta (1.2.28), Bāḍarāyaṇa cites Jaimini as saying that "There is no contradiction in taking Vaishvānara as the supreme Brahman".

In 1.2.31, Jaimini is again quoted by Bāḍarāyana as saying that the nirguna (attribute-less) Brahman can manifest itself as having a form.

In 4.3.12, Bādarāyana again cites Jaimini as saying that the mukta Purusha attains Brahman.

In Pūrva Mīmāṁsā too, Jaimini emphasises the importance of faith in and attachment to the Omnipotent Supreme Being Whom Jaimini calls "The Omnipotent Pradhāna" (The Main):

Pūrva Mīmāṁsā 6.3.1: "sarvaśaktau pravṛttiḥ syāt tathābhūtopadeśāt" (सर्वशक्तौ प्रवृत्तिः स्यात् तथाभूतोपदेशात्). The term upadeśa here means instructions of the śāstras as taught. We should tend towards the omnipotent supreme being. In the context of Pūrva Mīmāṁsā 6.3.1 shown above, next two sutras becomes significant, in which this Omnipotent Being is termed as "pradhāna", and keeping away from Him is said to be a "doṣa", hence all beings are asked to get related ("abhisambandhāt" in tadakarmaṇi ca doṣas tasmāt tato viśeṣaḥ syāt pradhānenābhisambandhāt; Jaimini 6, 3.3) to the "Omnipotent Main Being" (api vāpy ekadeśe syāt pradhāne hy arthanirvṛttir guṇamātram itarat tadarthatvāt; Jaimini 6, 3.2). Karma-Mīmāṁsā supports the Vedas, and Rgveda says that one Truth is variously named by the sages. It is irrelevant whether we call Him as Pradhāna or Brahman or Vaishvānara or Shiva or God.

==== Unity between Mīmāṁsā and Vedānta ====
Ramanuja, of the Vishishtadvaita school of Vedanta, argues for "aikyaśāstra", the unity amongst the Mīmāṁsā and Vedānta texts, namely the Pūrva Mīmāṁsā Sutras and the Uttara Mīmāṁsā Sutras. The Uttara Mīmāṁsā Sutras are also known as the Brahma Sutras. Ramanuja argues that this 'integrated' textual corpus called the "śārīraka". This idea was expounded upon by Ramanuja's commentators, such as Sudarsanasuri. Srikantha of the Shiva Advaita school of Vedanta also asserts that there is unity amongst Mīmāṁsā and Vedānta. Critically engaging with Sudarsanasuri, Appayya Diksita argues that the two texts, the Pūrva Mīmāṁsā Sutras and the Brahma Sutras, cannot actually be a single integrated textual corpus because both texts contradict on what the final results of actions will be.

== Legacy ==
The school for some time in the early middle ages exerted near-dominant influence on learned Hindu thought, and is credited as a major force contributing to the decline of Buddhism in India. However, it had fallen into decline in the high middle ages and today is all but eclipsed by Vedanta.

== See also ==
- Śrauta
- Vaikhanasa
- Nambudiri
- Charvaka
- Vaisheshika
- Samkhya
- Yoga
- Nyaya
- Vedanta
- Śālikanātha
- Mimamsa – IISER Pune
