= Kriti Janaka =

King of Videha

Kriti
- Janaka
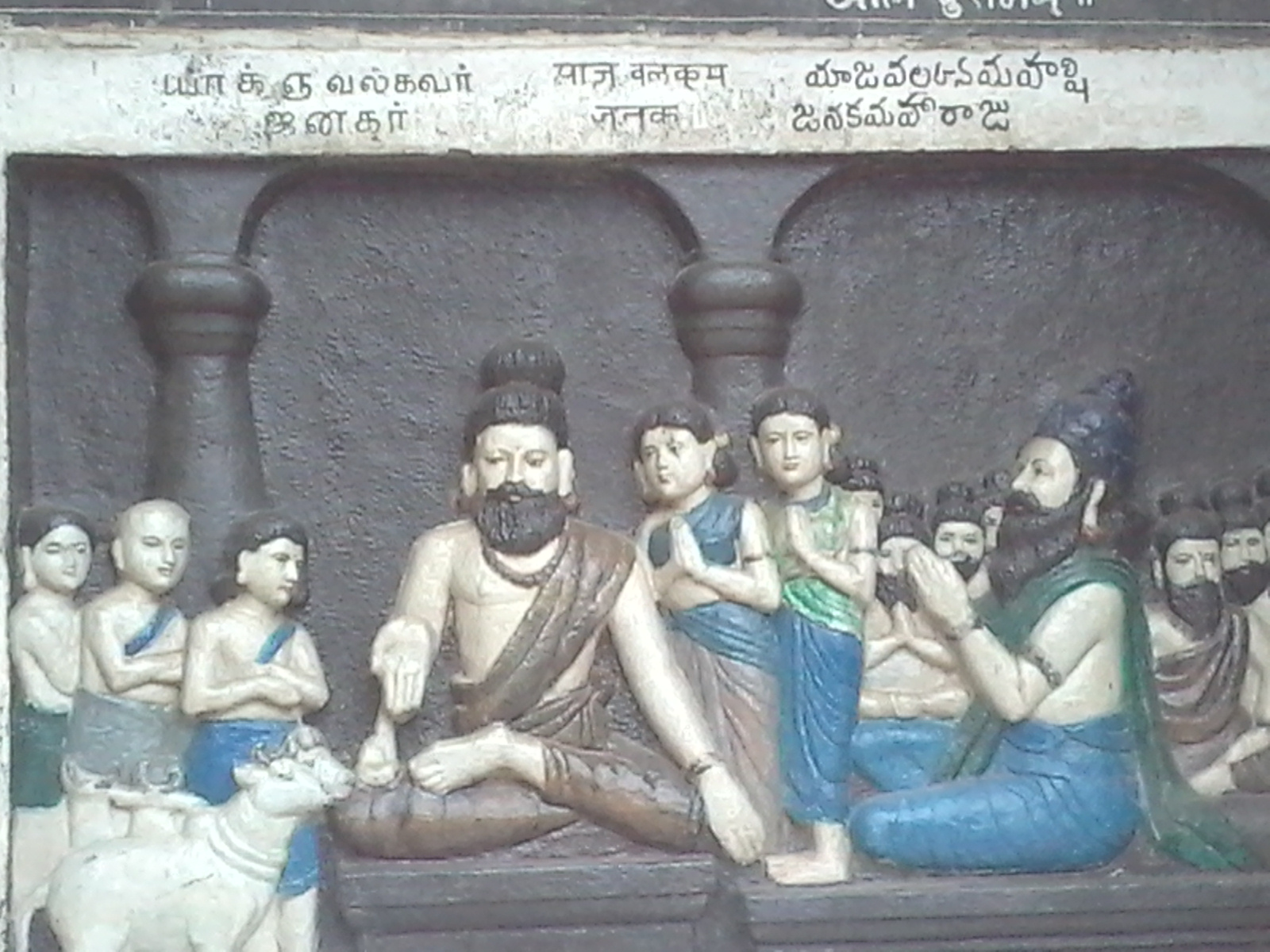
- Depicting the sage Yajnavalkya at the court of King Kriti Janaka in Mithila. The image is carved on the wall of the Sankara Mutt at Rameshwaram in Tamil Nadu, India.
- Born: Videha Kingdom (Mithila)
Names
- Kriti Janaka
Regnal name
- Videha Raj Kriti Janaka
- Sanskrit: कृति जनक, कृतजनक
- Kingdom: Videha
- Kingdom: Mithila
- Dynasty: Janaka
- Father: Bahulashva Janaka
- Religion: Hinduism
- Occupation: Philosopher King

Kriti Janaka (Sanskrit: कृति जनक) was a king of Videha Kingdom located in the Indian subcontinent. He was a descendant of Janaka dynasty in Mithila. He was contemporary to the kings Ajatshatru of Kashi Kingdom and Janamejaya of Hastinapur. The revered Vedic Rishi Yajnavalkya became famous from his court. According to some scholars, Kriti Janaka was the eighteenth king of Mithila after the King Siradhwaja Janaka of Ramayana.

== Early life ==
He was born in the royal family of Janaka dynasty. He was the son of the King Bahulāśva Janaka in Mithila. He was born slightly before the war of Mahabharata.

Apart from the son of King Bahulāśva, there were more two or three Janakas having same name Kriti in the lineage of Janaka. Some scholars mark them as Kriti I, Kriti II and Kriti III. But due to the lack of sufficient literary resources, it is difficult to distinguish them simultaneously. There are some disputes among scholars for the exact identifications of them.

== Description ==
Kriti Janaka was the most famous king across the subcontinent during his reign. The contemporary King Ajatashatru of Kashi was very jealous from the fame of the King Kriti Janaka in Mithila. Due to the jealousy of King Ajatashatru with the King Kriti Janaka, there were frequent conflicts between the two kingdoms.

== Kriti Janaka's court ==
The court of the King Kriti Janaka was an assembly of learned Brahmins arrived from different parts of the subcontinent. His court was adorned with several scholars like Ashvala, Artabhaga, Bhujyu, Ushasta, Kahola, Gargi, Uddalaka and others. The Vedic scholar Ashvala was the chief advisor of the king at his court.

Once the King Janaka organised a famous scholarly contest Bahudakshina Yajna at his court, in which several Brahmin scholars across the subcontinent gathered to participate in the contest. In the contest, the Vedic sage Yajnavalkya defeated all the Brahmins scholars who debated with him. He was declared as the greatest Vedic scholar and was awarded with the honour of the title Brahmishtha. After that, Yajnavalkya was appointed as the chief advisor cum minister of the King Kriti Janaka.

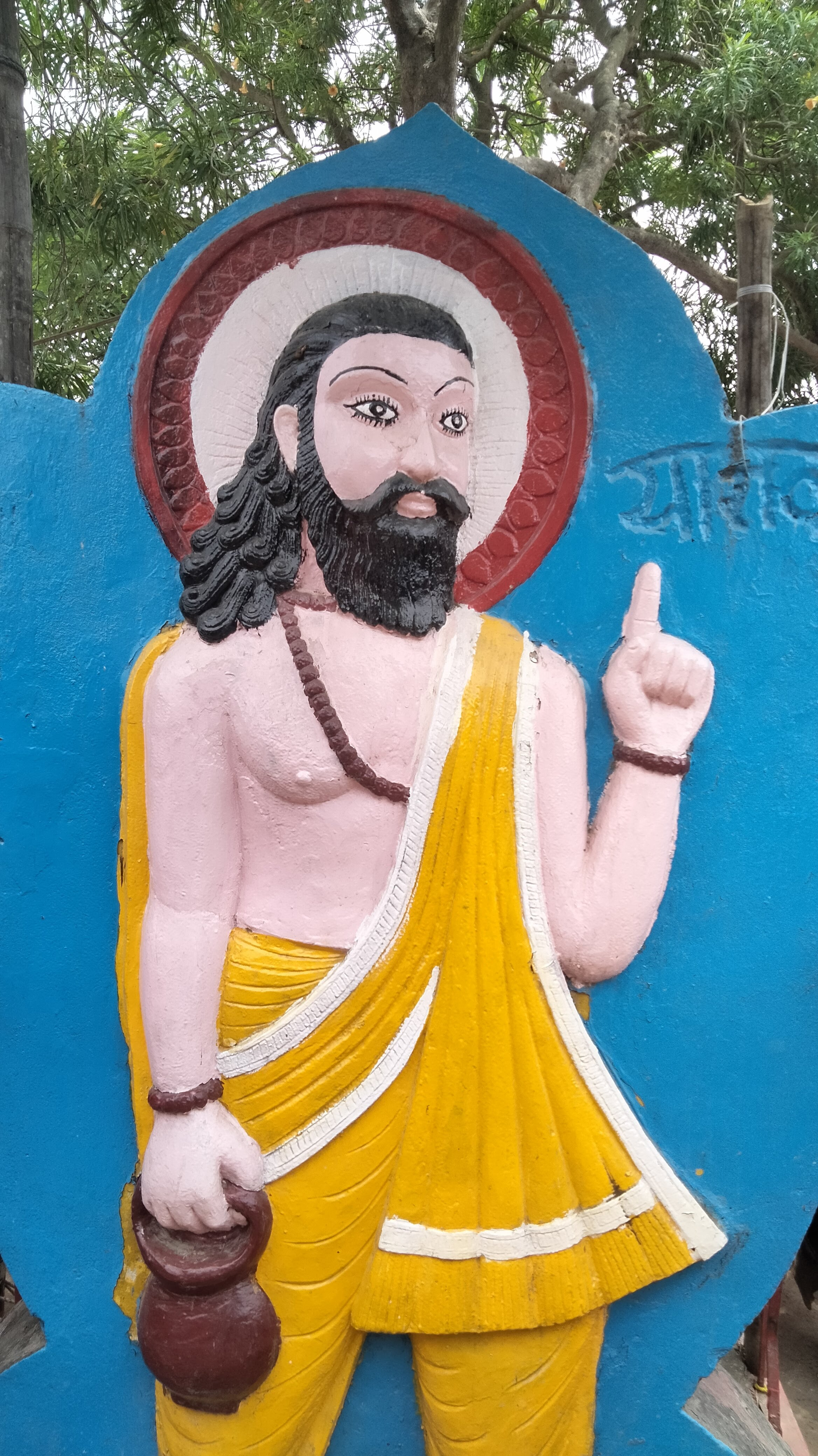
Memorial Statue of Yajnavalkya at the premises of Uchchaith Bhagwati Mandir near Benipatti town.

The King Kriti Janaka patronized Vedic philosophy and scholarship at his court. The assembly of his court was a prominent hub for Sanskrit and Vedic learning in Mithila.
