= Bahudakshina Yajna =

Scholarly Yajna of the Ancient Mithila University

- Devanagari: बहुदक्षिणा यज्ञ
- Title means: The Yajna in which scholars are awarded by monetary gifts
- Place: Court of King Janaka in Mithila
- Type: Scholarly Yajna
- Philosophy: Indian philosophy

Bahudakshina Yajna (Devanagari: बहुदक्षिणा यज्ञ) was a famous scholarly yajna organised by King Kriti Janaka of Mithila at his court. It was organised in order to find the best brahmagyaani (or brahma-nishtha; greatest scholar of Vedas) among the participating Brahmin scholars in the yajna. It is mentioned in the Hindu scripture, the Brihadaranyaka Upanishad.

== Etymology ==
Bahudakshina Yajna is made by two Sanskrit words Bahudakshina and Yajna. The word Bahudakshina is compound Sanskrit word made by two Sanskrit terms Bahu and Dakshina. The literal meaning of Bahu is many, large, big or great, etc. similarly the literal meaning of Dakshina is fees, honorarium, gift, donation given to Gurus or religious leaders or the money and donation given at the end of Yajna to priests. The literal meaning of Yajna is Vedic rituals described in the Brahmana texts. Thus the literal meaning of Bahudakshina Yajna is the Yajna in which learned Brahmins, scholars or priests are awarded with a large monetary gifts for their scholarly wisdom by the Yajmaana. The term Bahudakshina is also mentioned in a shloka of the text Narada Purana as

एकेन जन्मना मोक्षं परमान्पोति स ध्रुवम् । अग्निहोत्राणि वेदाश्च यज्ञाश्च बहुदक्षिणाः ॥

— Book 2 (Uttarārdhaḥ), Chapter 41, Shloka 10, Narada Purana

== Description ==
According to the text Brihadaranyaka Upanishad, there is reference of Bahudakshina Yajna organised by the King Janaka of Mithila at his court, in which Brahmin scholars from different parts of the Indian subcontinent were invited to take part in the Yajna. The Brahmin scholars from Kuru and Panchala also participated in the Yajna. The King Janaka announced at his court that the greatest scholar of Vedas among the participating Brahmin scholars in the Yajna would be gifted one thousand milk giving cows along with ten Pādas of gold fixed on the horns of each cows.

The King Janaka asked the participating Brahmin scholars in the assembly that who among you all is the greatest scholar "Brahmistha" of Vedas. He said that the greatest scholar among you could drive these cows to his home. It is said that listening the announcement of the king Janaka, no one dared to declare himself as the greatest Vedic scholar "Brahmistha". The assembly got silent for a while.

In the assembly Yajnavalkya was also present there. After a while, he stood up in the assembly and ordered his disciple Sāmaśravas to drive those cows to his Ashram. This act of Yajnavalkya angered the Brahmin scholars present in the assembly as they felt that it was their insult as he was taking the award without taking part in the debate.

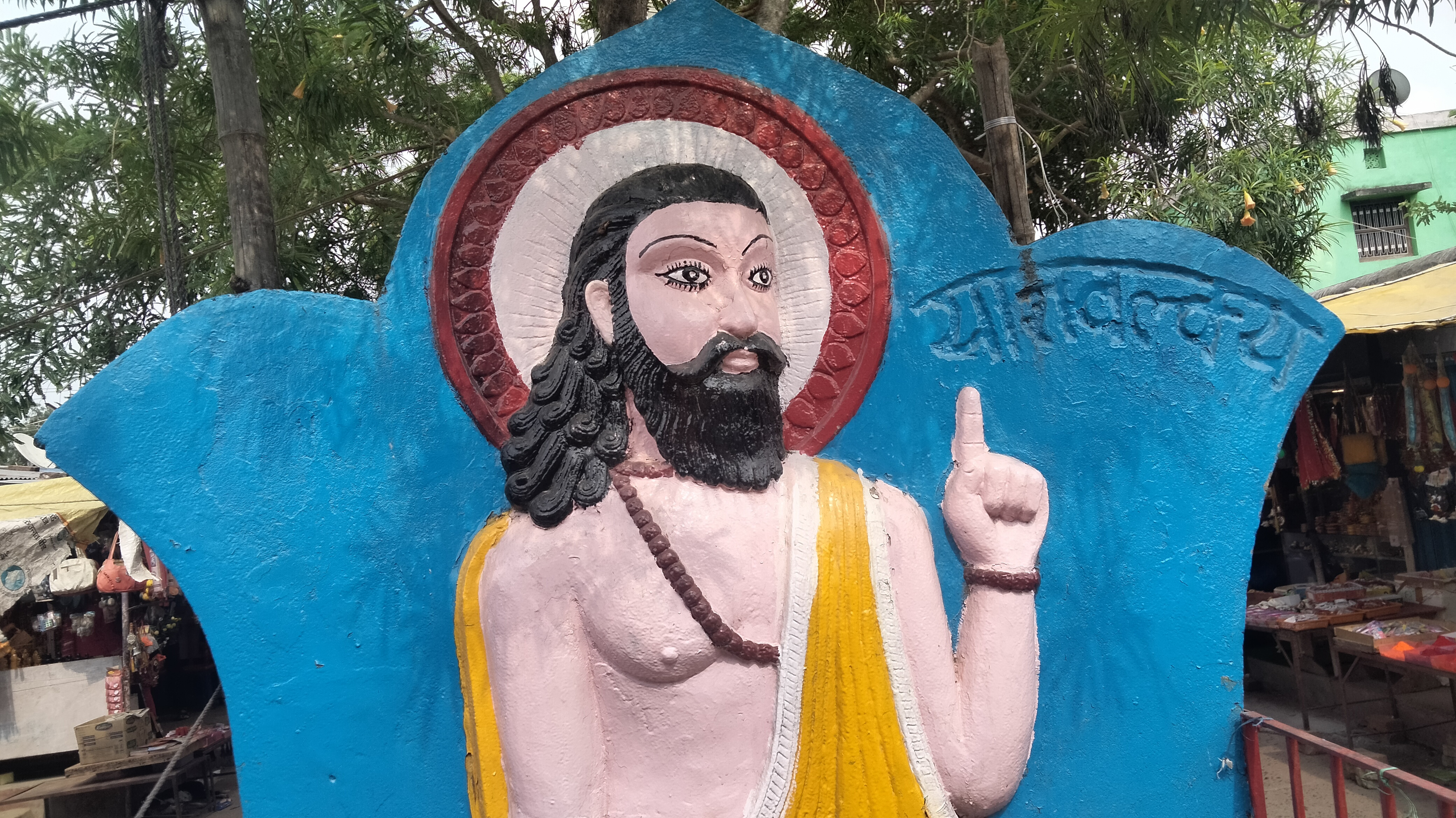
Memorial Statue of Yajnavalkya at the entrance of Uchchaith Bhagawati Mandir in Madhubani district near Benipatti Town in the Mithila region

After that eight Brahmin scholars in the assembly debated with the sage Yajnavalkya one by one but none of them was able to defeat him. The eight Brahmin scholars who debated with the sage Yajnavalkya in the assembly were Ashvala, Artabhaga, Bhujyu, Ushasta, Kahola, Gargi, Uddalaka and Vidagdha. The debate with Yajnavalkya was started by the Chief Priest Ashvala of the kingdom. The lady scholar Gargi also honoured as Brahamvadini debated with Yajnavalkya two times but was unable to defeat him in any attempts. Vidagdha was the last Brahmin scholar who debated with Yajnavalkya. He was also not able to defeat Yajnavalkya. After that Yajnavalkya was declared the greatest Vedic scholar by the King Janaka at his court. Later king Janaka appointed Yajnavalkya as his royal teacher and spiritual advisor.

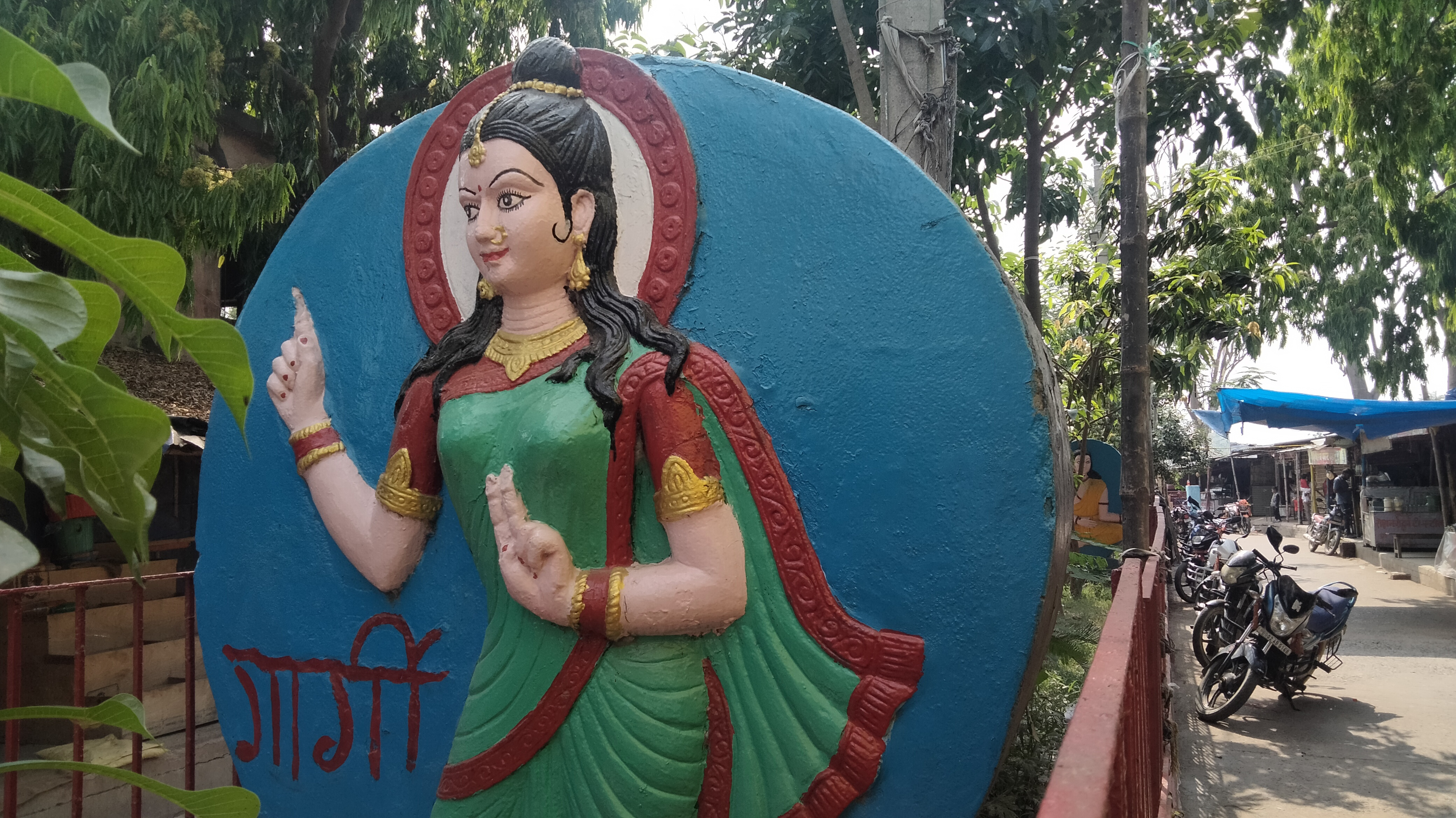
Memorial statue of the Brahmvadini Gargi Vachaknavi at the entrance of the sacred complex of the Uchchaith Bhagawati Mandir

== Significance in Indian philosophy ==
The priestly contest at the court of King Janaka during the Bahudakshina Yajna had played an important role in the foundation of the Vedanta School of Indian philosophy. In the contest the sage Yajnavalkya explained the nature of reality. He revealed the concepts of Atman and Brahman during the contest. The concepts of the Atman and the Brahman serve as the fundamental principles of the Vedanta school of thought in the Indian philosophy and explain the ultimate truth of the universe.

The concept of 33 gods in Hinduism was discussed at the court of King Janaka during the Bahudakshina Yajna between the sages Yajnavalkya and Shakalya Vidagdha. It is a key concept in the Vedanta school of thought.
