= Gārgī Vāchaknavī =

Ancient Indian sage and philosopher

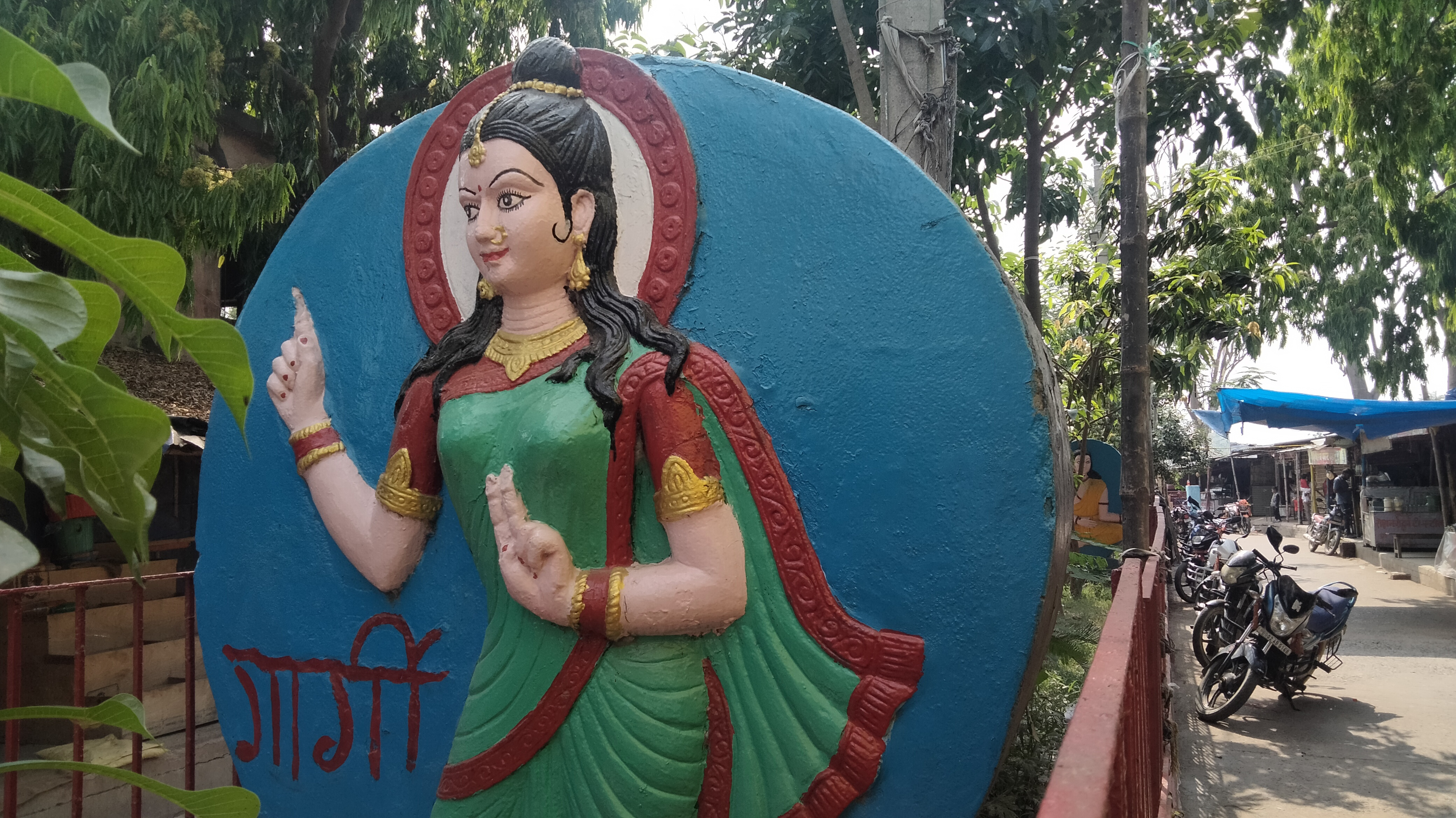
Statue of Gargi at the complex of the Uchchaith Bhagawati Mandir near Benipatti town in the Madhubani district of the Mithila region of Bihar, India.

Gargi Vachaknavi (Sans: गार्गी वाचक्नवी (Devanagari); Gārgī Vācaknavī (IAST)) was an ancient Indian sage and philosopher. In Vedic literature, she is honoured as a great natural philosopher, renowned expounder of the Vedas, and known as Brahmavadini, a person with knowledge of Brahma Vidya. In the Sixth and the eighth Brahmana of Brihadaranyaka Upanishad, her name is prominent as she participates in the brahmayajna, a philosophic debate organized by King Janaka of Videha, during which she challenges the sage Yajnavalkya with perplexing questions on the issue of atman (soul). She remained celibate all her life and was venerated by Hindus.

Gargi, the daughter of the sage Vachaknu from the lineage of the sage Garga (c. 800-500 BCE), was named after her father Gargi Vachaknavi. From a young age, she evinced a keen interest in Vedic scriptures and became very proficient in fields of philosophy. She became highly knowledgeable in the Vedas and Upanishads in the Vedic times and held intellectual debates with other philosophers.

== Early life ==
Gargi was the daughter of the sage Vachaknu from the lineage of the sage Garga (c. 800-500 BCE), and was hence named after her father. From a young age, Vachaknavi was very intellectual, acquiring knowledge of the Vedas and scriptures.

== Later life ==
Gargi, alongside Vadava Pratitheyi and Sulabha Maitreyi, was one of the most prominent women of the Upanishads. She was as knowledgeable in Vedas and Upanishads as men of the Vedic times and could very well contest the male-philosophers in debates. Her name appears in the Grihya Sutras of Asvalayana. She was a leading scholar who also made rich contributions to propagate education.

== Debate with Yajnavalkya ==
According to the Brihadaranyaka Upanishad, King Kriti Janaka of Videha Kingdom held a Rajasuya Yagna and invited all the sages, kings, and princes of India to participate. The yagna lasted for many days, and large quantities of sandalwood, ghee (clarified butter) and barley (cereal grain) were offered to the Yagna fire to create an atmosphere of spiritual sanctity and aroma. Janaka, himself a scholar, was impressed with the large gathering of sages, and wanted to find the scholar among them who had the most knowledge of Brahman. He stated that he would give a prize of 1,000 cows, each carrying 10 grams of gold, to this scholar. Among the scholars present were Yajnavalkya and Gargi Vachaknavi. Yajnavalkya believed he was the most advanced of those present due to his mastery of Kundalini Yoga, and ordered his disciple Samsrava to lead the cow herd to his house. Before he could do so, eight sages including Vachaknavi challenged him to a debate. Shyam Ranganathan notes that Gargi was the only interlocutor to challenge Yajnavalkya twice during the dialogue.

Sages like Asvala, Janaka's priest, Artabhaga, Bhujyu, Ushasta, and Uddalaka debated with and lost to Yajnavalkya. It was then the turn of Gargi to take up the challenge. Gargi then questioned Yajnavalkya on his claim of superiority among the scholars, and they began debating. Gargi and Yajnavalkya's exchange centred on the ultimate "warp" of reality ("warp" means "the basic foundation or material of a structure or entity). Her initial dialogue with Yajnavalkya addressed metaphysical questions such as the unending status of the soul. She then asked him, "since this whole world is woven back and forth on water, on what then is it woven back and forth", a question addressing the commonly known cosmological metaphor that expressed the essential interconnectedness of the world. In the Brihadaranyaka Upanishad (3.6), she asks Yajnavalkya a series of questions that are answered thus:

On air, Gargi.
On What, then, is air woven back and forth? On the intermediate regions, Gargi.
On what, then, are the worlds of the intermediate regions woven back and forth?
On the worlds of the Gandharvas, Gargi

She continued with further questions, such as what was the universe of the suns, what were the moon, the stars, the gods, Indra, and Prajapati. Gargi then urged Yajnavalkya to enlighten her on the weave of reality and asked:

That, O Yajnavalkya, which is above the sky, that which is beneath the earth, that which is between these two, sky and earth, that which people call the past and the present and the future - across what is woven, warp and woof?"
Yagnavalakaya answered "Space"

Gargi, unsatisfied, posed the next question:

Across what then pray, is space woven, warp and woof?
Yajnavalkya answered: Verily, O Gargi, if one performs sacrifices and worship and undergoes austerity in this world for many thousands of years, but without knowing that Imperishable, limited indeed is that [work] of his. Across this Imperishable is the unseen, O Gargi, is space woven, warp and woof.

Then she asked a final question, asking what Brahman (world of the imperishable) was. Yagnavalakya then ended the debate by telling Gargi not to proceed further, lest she lose her mental balance. This ended their debate, and she conceded to Yajnavalkya's superior knowledge, stating: "venerable Brahmins, you may consider it a great thing if you get off bowing before him. No one, I believe, will defeat him in any argument concerning Brahman."

Her philosophical views were also mentioned in the Chandogya Upanishad. Gargi was honoured as one of the Navaratnas (nine gems) in the court of King Janaka of Mithila.

=== The Yoga Yajnavalkya ===
Gargi and Yajnavalkya also appear in the Yoga Yajnavalkya, a classical text on Yoga written much later than the Brihadaranyaka Upanishad. In this text however, Gargi is portrayed as Yajnavalkya's wife rather than as one of his interlocutors. Whilst she still questions Yajnavalkya in the Yoga Yajnavalkya, her questions are far less challenging and according to Indian philosophy scholar, Shyam Ranganathan, simply prompts to garner a 'lecture' from Yajnavalkya. The content of the Yoga Yajnavalkya and the Brihadaranyaka Upanishad are also distinct. Whilst the Brihadaranyaka Upanishad focuses on the nature of Brahman, the Yoga Yajnavalkya focuses on the eight limbs of Yoga. For these reasons, Shyam Ranganathan theorises that the Gargi of the Brihadaranyaka Upanishad and the Gargi of the Yoga Yajnavalkya are likely two different people.

== In popular culture ==
Actress Richa Soni portrayed the character of Gargi Vachaknavi in an Indian television series Siya Ke Ram which aired on Star Plus in 2015-16. Actress Meenakshi Sethi portrayed the role in Swastik Productions's television series Shrimad Ramayan.

== Bibliography ==
- Ahuja, M.L. (2011). Women in Indian Mythology. Rupa Publications. ISBN 978-81-291-2171-4.
- Banerji, Sures Chandra (1 January 1989). A Companion to Sanskrit Literature: Spanning a Period of Over Three Thousand Years, Containing Brief Accounts of Authors, Works, Characters, Technical Terms, Geographical Names, Myths, Legends, and Several Appendices. Motilal Banarsidass. ISBN 978-81-208-0063-2.
- Carmody, Denise; Brink, T. (1 January 2013). Cengage Advantage Books: Ways to the Center: An Introduction to World Religions. Cengage Learning. ISBN 978-1-285-41529-1.
- Gadkari, Jayant (1 January 1996). Society and Religion: From Rugveda to Puranas. Popular Prakashan. ISBN 978-81-7154-743-2.
- Glucklich, Ariel (11 April 2008). The Strides of Vishnu : Hindu Culture in Historical Perspective: Hindu Culture in Historical Perspective. Oxford University Press. ISBN 978-0-19-971825-2.
- Great Women of India. Know India. PrabhatPrakashan. 2005. ISBN 978-81-87100-34-8.
- Kapur-Fic, Alexandra R. (1 January 1998). Thailand: Buddhism, Society, and Women. Abhinav Publications. ISBN 978-81-7017-360-1.
- Kumar, Raj (1 January 2004). Essays on Social Reform Movements. Discovery Publishing House. ISBN 978-81-7141-792-6.
- Mody, Rekha (1999). A Quest for Roots: Stree Shakti. Stree Shakti.
- Mookerji, Radha Kumud (1 January 1998). Ancient Indian Education: Brahmanical and Buddhist. Motilal Banarsidass. ISBN 978-81-208-0423-4.
- O'Malley, Charles Donald (1970). The History of Medical Education: An International Symposium Held February 5-9, 1968. University of California Press. ISBN 978-0-520-01578-4.
