= Yajnavalkya =

8th century BCE Indian sage and philosopher

Brahmistha Yajnavalkya
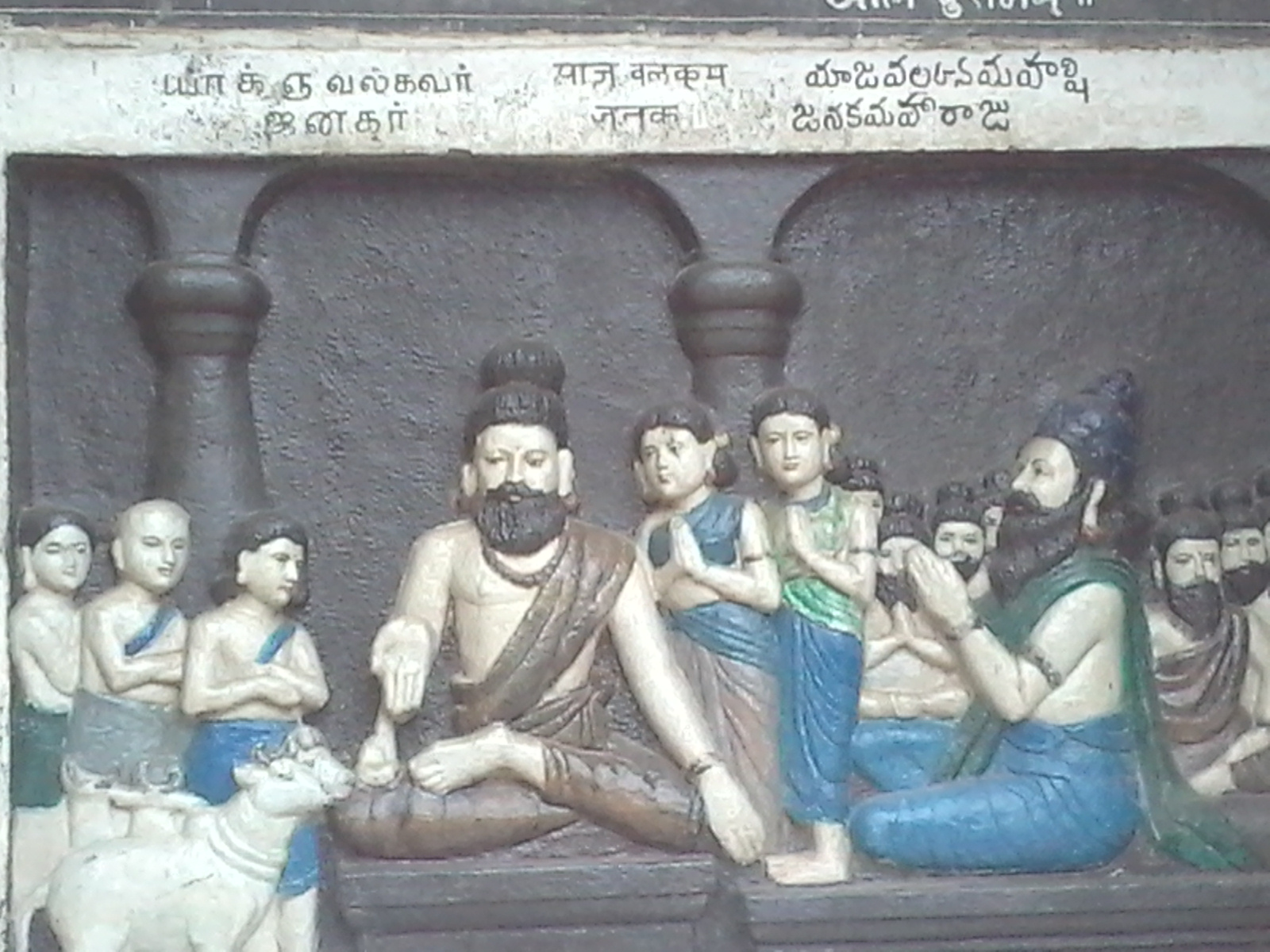
- Yajnavalkya teaches Brahma Vidya to King Janaka

Personal life
- Born: Fifth day during the waxing phase of moon in Phalgun Hindu month Videha
- Home town: Jagban
- Spouse: Maitreyi, Katyayani
- Region: Mithila region
- Notable idea: Neti neti
- Honors: Rishi

Religious life
- Religion: Hinduism
- Philosophy: Upanishad

Religious career
- Disciples: Janaka
- Influenced by: Aruni

Yajnavalkya or Yagyavalkya (Sanskrit: याज्ञवल्क्य, IAST: Yājñavalkya) is a Hindu Vedic sage prominently mentioned in the Brihadaranyaka Upanishad (c. 700 BCE) and Tattiriya Upanishad. Yajnavalkya proposes and debates metaphysical questions about the nature of existence, consciousness and impermanence, and expounds the epistemic doctrine of neti neti ("not this, not this") to discover the universal Self and Ātman. Texts attributed to him include the Yajnavalkya Smriti, Yoga Yajnavalkya and some texts of the Vedanta school. He is also mentioned in the Mahabharata as well as various Puranas, Brahmanas and Aranyakas.

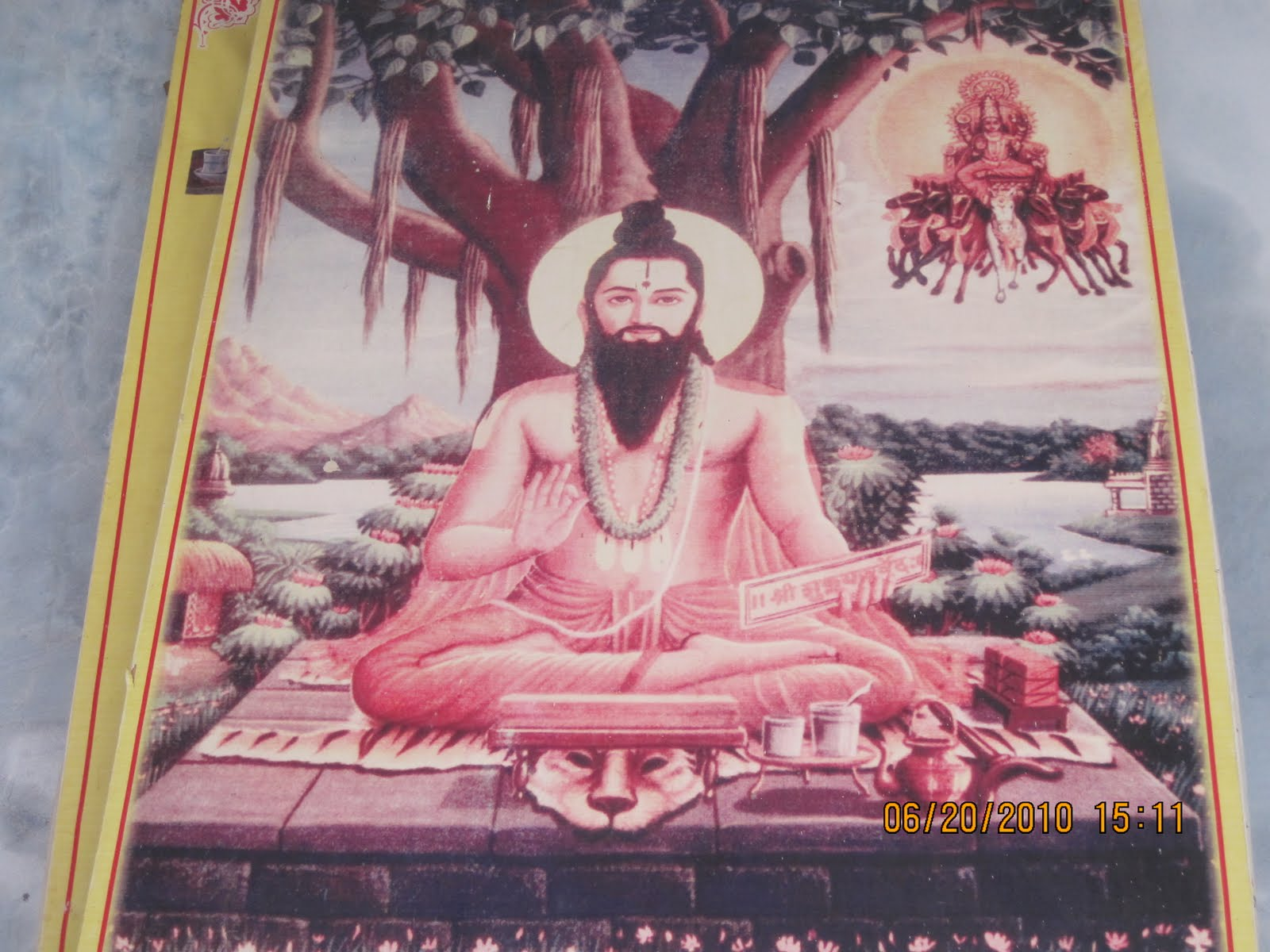
Imagery of Sage Yagnavalkya kept at Buddinni village in Karnataka

== Name ==
The name Yajnavalkya is derived from yajna, which connotes ritual.

== Depiction in texts ==
Yajnavalkya was a pupil of Vaisampayana and the compiler of the Shukla Yajurveda Samhita. Yajnavalkya was the pupil of Uddālaka Āruṇi.

Within both the Sukla Yajur Veda and the Brihadaranyaka Upanishad, he is depicted as being blunt, provocative and sarcastic. In the first verse of the Yajnavalkya Smriti, Yajnavalkya is described as the "yogesvara: meaning "the king of yogis".

Yajnavalkya plays a central position in a debate known as Bahudakshina Yajna hosted by King Kriti Janaka in Mithila, Videha, where Yajnavalkya defeats philosophers from all around the country. The debate ended with Gargi, a female scholar and one of the nine gems of King Janaka's court, clearly asserting Yajnavalkya as the most superior brahmin of them all.

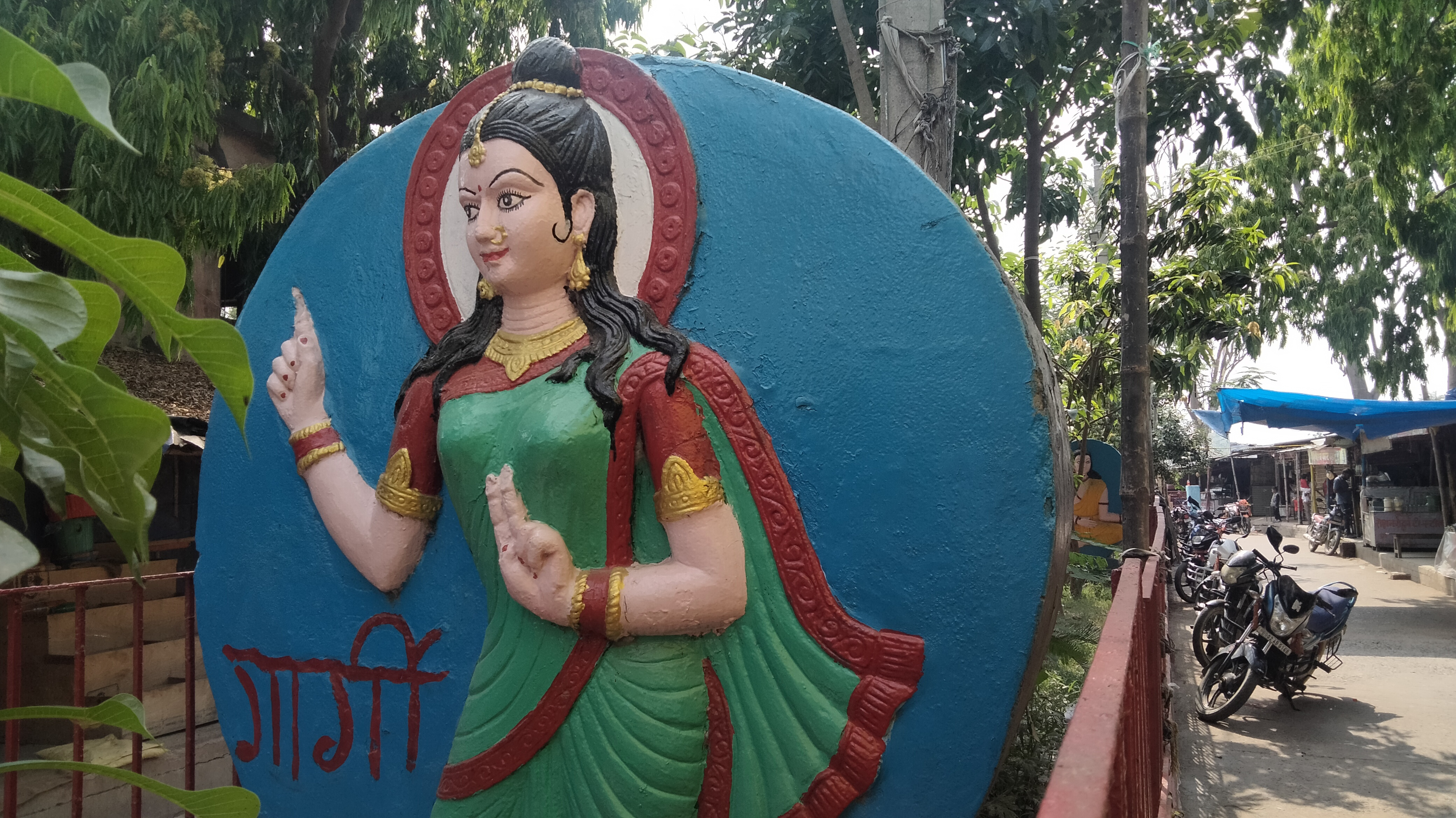
Memorial Statue of Gargi at the complex of Uchchaith Bhagawati Mandir

In the Brihadaranyaka Upanishad, a set of dialogues portrays Yajnavalkya as having two wives, Maitreyi and Katyayani. Maitreyi, as opposed to Katyayani, was more intrigued to gain spiritual knowledge. Maitreyi was known as a brahmavadini, a discusser of Brahman. Katyayani is merely described as "striprajna", which translates to "woman-like knowledge;" this can be interpreted as one who is well-versed in traditionally females roles. While Yajnavalkya and Katyayani lived in contented domesticity, Maitreyi studied metaphysics and engaged in theological dialogues with her husband in addition to "making self-inquiries of introspection". In contrast to the Brihadaranyaka Upanishad, the epic Mahabharata states Maitreyi is a young beauty who is an Advaita scholar but never marries.

Scharfstein considers Yajnavalkya to be one of the earliest philosophers in recorded history. Yajnavalkya is credited by Witzel for coining the term Advaita (non-duality of Atman and Brahman). The ideas attributed to him for renunciation of worldly attachments have been important to Hindu sannyasa traditions.

== Scriptural references ==
Yajnavalkya is associated with several major ancient texts in Sanskrit, namely the Shukla Yajurveda, the Shatapatha Brahmana, the Brihadaranyaka Upanishad, the Taittiriya Upanishad, the dharma sastra named Yājñavalkya Smṛti, Vriddha Yajnavalkya, and Brihad Yajnavalkya. He is also mentioned in the Mahabharata, Puranas, as well as in ancient Jainism texts such as the Isibhasiyaim. In the Jainism text Isibhasiyaim, the sage Yajnavalkya is also known as Jannavakka.

=== Taittiriya Upanishad ===
Yajnavalkya is referenced within the Taittiriya Upanishad. Once, the guru Vaisampayana got angry with Yajnavalkya, who was one of his leading disciples. He demanded that Yajnavalkya give back all of his knowledge he had learned from him. With such instructions, Yajnavalkya vomited all of the knowledge. The guru then instructed his other disciples to take the form of partridges (i.e., taittiriya birds) and consume what was regurgitated. This story is why the Upanishad was named the Taittiriya Upanishad. The story is meant to show Yajnavalkya's genius. Yajnavalkya was also said to have taken the guru's knowledge and to have added his own insight. Seeing such knowledge, the guru was pleased and instructed his other disciples to learn from Yajnavalkya. When a student has absorbed any knowledge and when he gives it out, it becomes more palatable to the other students who did not understand it directly from the teacher's learned discourse. Seeing that the delivery of Yājñavalkya was masterly, the teacher in appreciation, asked the other students of the class to absorb it like 'sparrows', which they did. A student is encouraged to be active for a thirst of knowledge like Taittiriya birds through this metaphor.

=== Brihadaranyanka Upanishad ===
The Brihadaranyaka Upanishad is dated at c. 700 BCE. The Brihadaranyaka Upanishad is known for highlighting Yajnavalkya's magnetic personality, focusing on his self-confidence.

Yajnavalkya plays a central position within the Brihadaranyaka Upanisad, which is a part of the Sukla Yajur Veda. The scripture details one of the most famous debates in Hindu texts in the presence of King Janaka in Mithila, Videha, which is in the east of India, where Yajnavalkya defeats philosophers from all around the country.

In the first story of the Brihadaranyak Upanisad, King Janaka hosts a sacrifice known as Bahudakshina Yajna, where he is willing to donate one thousand cows with gold horns to the best brahmin called as Brahmistha. Yajnavalkya immediately orders his disciple Samasrava to take the cows to his home. This causes an uproar in the palace amongst the other sages, led by Asvala, who wondered why Yajnavalkya proclaimed himself as the greatest. Yajnavalkya responds saying that he does not claim himself to be the greatest Brahmistha and whoever the greatest Brahmistha is should indeed be honoured. Yajnavalkya says he merely just wanted the cows. This leads to a philosophical debate amongst the sages, in which Yajnavalkya defeats each opponent who faces him by rightly answering their questions. Some of the key participants of the debate include Asvala, Uddalaka Aruni, Bhujyu, Sakalya, Artabhaga, Ushasta, Kahola and others, many who are well known within other Hindu literature.

Gargi later appears in two sections of the debate in sections 3.6 and 3.8 of the Brihadaranyaka Upanisad. Gargi was a female scholar and she was one of the nine gems of King Janaka's court. In 3.6, Gargi successively asks about what is the support or cause of different elements in the world, setting up a hierarchical ordering of the world. Gargi finally asks about the support of Brahman. Yajnavalkya responds, "Do not, O Gargi, question too much, lest your head should fall off. You are questioning too much about a deity whom we should not ask too much."

Yajnavalkya threatens Gargi not to ask what is beyond Brahman. Gargi becomes silent. Yajnavalkya intended to explain that one cannot question who is the support of that which is the support of everything. Yajnavalkya's threat is not produced out coercion to halt the asking of complex questions, but to end a discussion that had become finite, which Gargi had not realized yet.

In 3.8, Gargi asks a final series of questions to Yajnavalkya proclaiming that if he can answer these questions, no other brahmin could beat him in this debate. This time, it is seen that Gargi's rhetoric has shifted; rather than asking questions impetuously or over-eagerly like that in 3.6, Gargi's questioning becomes more pointed and focused at reaching the pinnacle of the debate through a final test. She first asks, "That which is above the sky, that which is below earth, that which is between the sky and earth, and that which people call the past, present, and future – [what is the support of this all]?" Yajnavalkya responds by saying that the support of this is space. Gargi then asks what is the support of space. Yajnavalkya responds by discussing the metaphysical element known as Akshar (Brihadaryanka Upanishad 3.8.8-9), or that which is imperishable. Yajnavalkya says, "This imperishable, Gargi, is the seer but isn't seen; is the hearer, but isn't heard; is the thinker, but isn't thought of; is the perceiver, but isn't perceived. Other than this, there is no seer. Other than this, there is no hearer. Other than this, there is no thinker. Other than this, there is no perceiver."

Gargi's scholarship is depicted through the fact that she is the first person in the entire debate to discuss the concept of Brahman. The debate ends when Gargi, a female scholar, clearly asserts Yajnavalkya as the most superior of them all.

In the fourth chapter of the Brihadaranyaka Upanisad, Yajnavalkya decides to renounce and leave his family. At that time, Yajnavalkya's wife, Maitreyi, inquires about the concept of the soul to Yajnavalkya. Maitreiyi, was also very wise and scholarly. She had once asked Yajnavalkya if she would become immortal with all the wealth in the world, in which Yajnavalkya responded with a denial. She then preaches, "What should I do with that by which I do not become immortal?"

The Brihadaranyaka Upanisad is one of the first texts to depict women in religious debate. Both Gargi and Maitreyi discuss the deepest spiritual topics of the Brihadaranyaka Upanisad, namely about Brahman and the atman, showing their knowledge and curiosity.

== Works ==
=== Sukla Yajur Veda ===
Yajnavalkya was the seer of who received the Shukla Yajurveda from the Divine. Thus, he is known as the founder of the Sukla Yujurveda tradition. Yajnavalkya himself mentions, "Anyone who desires to master yoga should know the Aranyaka that I received from the sun as well as the yoga treatise that I proclaimed." (Yajnavalkya Smriti 3.110).

=== Yajnavalkya Smriti ===
The Yagnavalkya Smriti provides instructions to people of all walks of life, including brahmins. It is written as a discourse from Yajnavalka to his sagely disciples about the laws or dharmas of society. The scripture is broken into three sections discussing: (1) achara (i.e., behavior), (2) vyavahara (i.e., legal procedure), and (3) prayascita (i.e., atonement). In the second section, Yagnavalkya breaks down the entire court process into four steps: plaint, plea, evidence and verdict. In the third section, Yajnavalkya claims that through prayascita, the soul and the world are pleased. (Yajnavalkya Smriti 3.20).

The Yajnavalkya Smriti is often comparable to a priorly written dharma sastra, the Manu Smriti. Both the Manu Smriti and Yajnavalkya Smriti are considered the ultimate sources of Hindu Law, however, Yagnavalkya's smriti was considered more authoritative than that of Manu's. Although both works are similar, Yajnavalkya places less emphasis on rigidity and more focus on practicality. Yajnavalkya's smriti is also more precise and organized than that of Manu's. The British also considered the Yajnavalkya Smriti the basis of what they called "the Hindu Law".

The Yajnavalkya Smriti became even more well-known through a commentary written on it by Vijnaneshvara called the Mitakshara in the mid-twelfth century.

=== Yoga Yajnavalkya ===
The Yoga Yajnavalkya is a commentary by Yajnavalkya on the knowledge of Yoga.

The actual author of Yoga Yajnavalkya text was probably someone who lived many centuries after the Vedic sage Yajnavalkya. Ian Whicher, a professor of Religion at the University of Manitoba, states that the author of Yoga Yajnavalkya may be an ancient Yajnavalkya, but this Yajnavalkya is not to be confused with the Vedic-era Yajnavalkya "who is revered in Hinduism for Brihadaranyaka Upanishad".

According to Vishwanath Narayan Mandlik, these references to Yajnavalkya in other texts, in addition to the eponymous Yoga Yajnavalkya, may be two different sages with the same name.

== Ideas ==
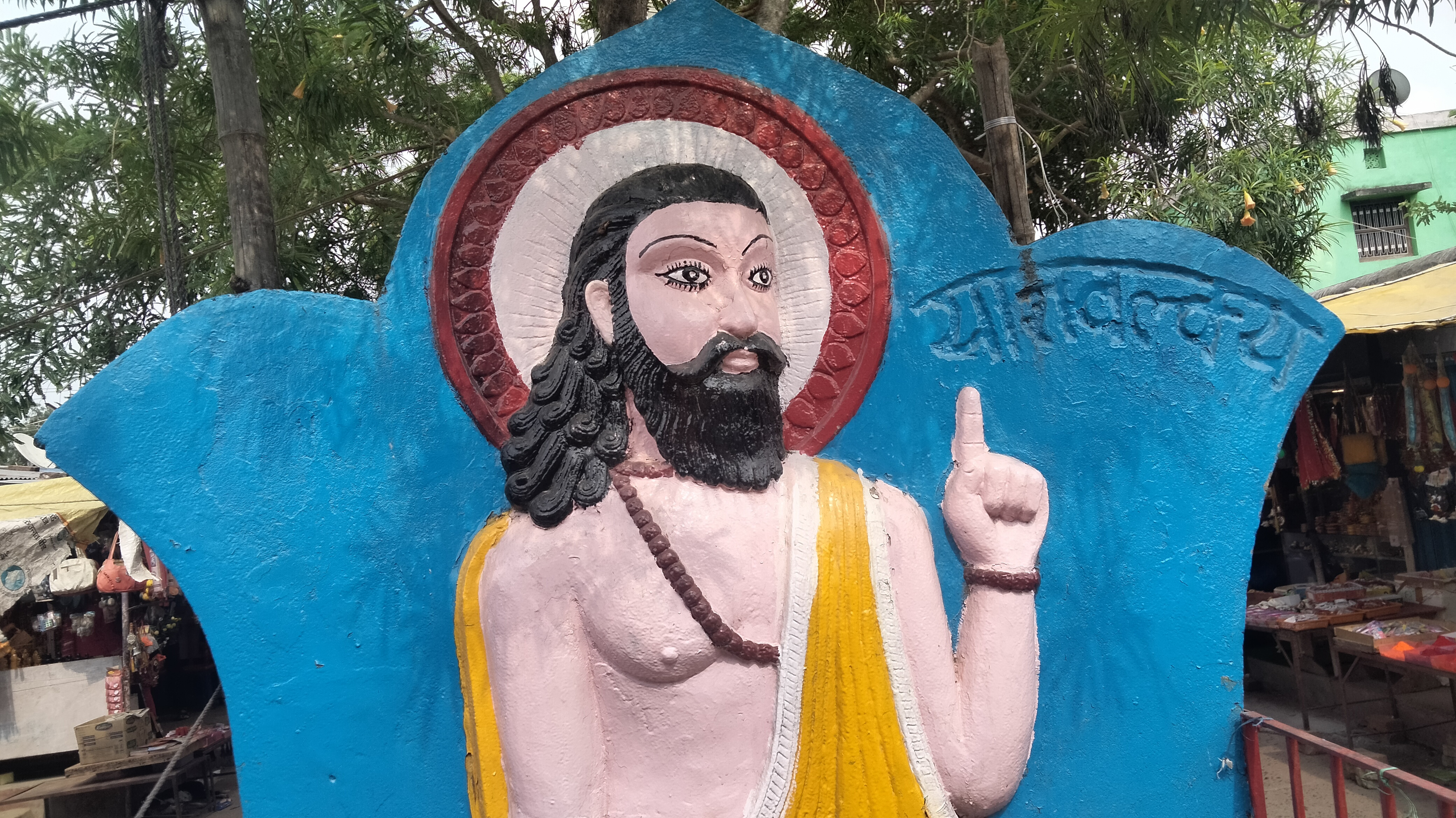
Statue of Yajnavalkya at the entrance of Uchchaith Bhagawati Mandir near Benipatti town in the Madhubani district of the Mithila region in Bihar

=== On karma and rebirth ===
One of the early expositions of karma and rebirth theories appears in the discussions of Yajnavalkya.

Now as a man is like this or like that,
according as he acts and according as he behaves, so will he be;
a man of good acts will become good, a man of bad acts, bad;
he becomes pure by pure deeds, bad by bad deeds;

And here they say that a person consists of desires,
and as is his desire, so is his will;
and as is his will, so is his deed;
and whatever deed he does, that he will reap.

— Brihadaranyaka Upanishad 4.4.5-6,

Max Muller and Paul Deussen, in their respective translations, describe the Upanishad's view of "Soul, Self" and "free, liberated state of existence" as, "[Self] is imperishable, for he cannot perish; he is unattached, for he does not attach himself; unfettered, he does not suffer, he does not fail. He is beyond good and evil, and neither what he has done, nor what he has omitted to do, affects him. (...) He therefore who knows it [reached self-realization], becomes quiet, subdued, satisfied, patient, and collected. He sees self in Self, sees all as Self. Evil does not overcome him, he overcomes all evil. Evil does not burn him, he burns all evil. Free from evil, free from spots, free from doubt, he became Atman-Brâhmana; this is the Brahma-world, O King, thus spoke Yajnavalkya."

=== On spiritual liberation ===
The section 4.3 of the Brihadaranyaka Upanishad is attributed to Yajnavalkya. It has a dialogue between Janaka and Yajnavalkya exploring the nature of the Atman in different states of consciousness and existence, including wakefulness, dream, deep sleep, death, migration, and final liberation. It discusses the premises of moksha (liberation, freedom), and provides some of its most studied hymns. Paul Deussen calls it, "unique in its richness and warmth of presentation", with profoundness that retains its full worth in modern times.

=== On the light of man ===
When asked by King Janaka",What is the light of man?" he replies, "The sun, O King; for, having the sun alone for his light, man sits, moves about, does his work, and returns." Then the king asks, "When the sun sets, what is the light of man?" He replies, "The moon indeed is his light; for, having the moon alone for his light, man sits, moves about, does his work, and returns." Then the king asks, "When the sun has set, O Yajnavalkya, and the moon has set, what is the light of man ?" He replies, "Fire indeed is his light; for, having fire alone for his light, man sits, moves about, does his work, and returns." Then the king asks, "When the sun has set, O Yajnavalkya, and the moon has set, and the fire is gone out, what is then the light of man?" He replies, "Sound indeed is his light; for, having sound alone for his light, man sits, moves about, does his work, and returns. Therefore, O King, when one cannot see even one's own hand, yet when a sound is raised, one goes towards it." Then the king asks, "When the sun has set, O Yajnaavalkya, and the moon has set, and the fire is gone out, and the sound hushed, what is then the light of man?" He replies, "The Self indeed is his light; for, having the Self alone as his light, man sits, moves about, does his work, and returns."

=== On the self ===
He describes the self by a series of negations and says it is not, not (neti, neti) - not graspable, not destructible, not attached, not disturbed by anything good or bad done by himself. He then says, he who knows this truth remains "controlled, at peace, patient and full of faith" and "everyone comes to be his self" and "he becomes the self of everyone"

=== On dreams ===
Yajnavalkya believed that dreams are active projections of the self. To him, this is evidence that dreaming shares the creative nature of Reality in itself.

=== On love and soul ===
The Maitreyi-Yajnavalkya dialogue in the Brihadaranyaka Upanishad states that love is driven by "love for oneself (ātman)", and discusses the nature of Atman and Brahman and their unity, which forms the core of later Advaita philosophy. The dialogue has survived in two manuscript recensions from the Madhyamdina and Kanva Vedic schools. Although they have significant literary differences, they share the same philosophical theme.

This dialogue appears in several Hindu texts; the earliest is in chapter 2.4 – and modified in chapter 4.5 – of the Brihadaranyaka Upanishad, one of the principal and oldest Upanishads. Adi Shankara, a scholar of the influential Advaita Vedanta school of Hindu philosophy, wrote in his Brihadaranyakopanishad bhashya that the purpose of the Maitreyi-Yajnavalkya dialogue in chapter 2.4 of the Brihadaranyaka Upanishad is to highlight the importance of the knowledge of Atman and Brahman, and to understand their oneness. According to Shankara, the dialogue suggests renunciation is prescribed in the Sruti (vedic texts of Hinduism), as a means to knowledge of the Brahman and Atman. He adds, that the pursuit of self-knowledge is considered important in the Sruti because the Maitreyi dialogue is repeated in chapter 4.5 as a "logical finale" to the discussion of Brahman in the Upanishad.

Concluding his dialogue on the "inner self", or soul, Yajnavalkaya tells Maitreyi:

One should indeed see, hear, understand and meditate over the Self, O Maitreyi;
indeed, he who has seen, heard, reflected and understood the Self – by him alone the whole world comes to be known.

— Brihadaranyaka Upanishad 2.4.5b

=== On dharma ===
In Yajnavalkya Smriti, Yajnavalkya emphasizes the plurality of dharma, drawing from multiple sources including the Vedas, recollections, righteous conduct, self-satisfaction, and desire rooted in right intention. He introduces the idea that fulfilling desires with the right intention is part of dharma, a departure from previous texts. Yajnavalkya emphasizes the significance of gift-giving (dana) and yoga in dharma, considering them central practices. He suggests that those who understand the self hold superior knowledge of dharma. Yajnavalkya categorizes dharma into three divisions, covering everyday life, royal conduct, and extraordinary circumstances. He recognizes that not all dharma originates from Vedic sources; some are derived from worldly customs or enforced by rulers.

== See also ==
- Neti neti
- Ancient Mithila University
- Janaka of Videha
- Gargi Vachaknavi
- Uddalaka Aruni
- Ashtavakra
- Yajnavalkya Ashram
- Durwakshat Mantra
- Yjnayavalkya Lakshminarayan Vidyapeeth
- Yajnavalkya Jayanti
