= Brahmishtha =

Best knower of Brahman

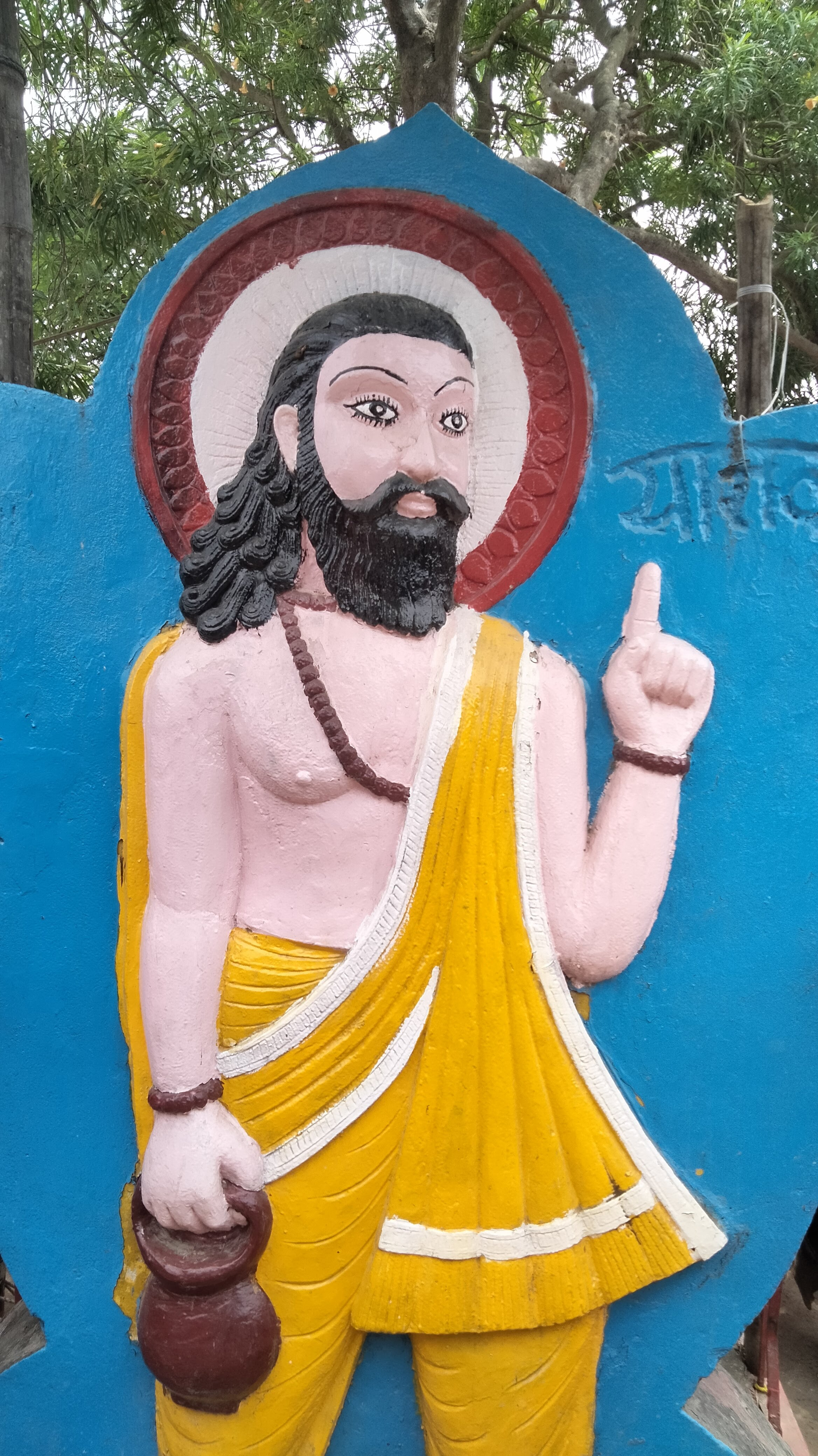
- Statue of the Brahmishtha Yagyavalkya at Uchchaith Bhagwati Mandir
- Origin: Vedas
- Original form: ब्रह्मिष्ठ
- Context: Brihadaranyaka Upanishad
- Coined by: King Janaka
- Meaning: "The wisest Brahmin"; "One who has attained greatest knowledge of Vedas"; "The best knower of Brahman"

Brahmishtha (Sanskrit: ब्रह्मिष्ठ, Romanised: Brahmiṣṭha) is a Sanskrit word used for denoting the highest Vedic scholar. The word Brahmishtha is found in the Vedic literatures. A Brahmin who has attained the greatest knowledge of Vedas is called as Brahmishtha. The word Brahmishtha is also defined as "the best knower of Brahman".

== Etymology ==
Brahmishtha is the superlative degree form of the word Brāhmaṇa. The highest degree of Brāhmaṇa is termed as Brahmishtha.The knower of Brahman is term as Brāhmaṇa and the greatest knower of Brahman is term as Brahmishtha.

== Description ==
In the philosophical text Brihadaranyaka Upanishad, the word Brahmishtha was used by the King Janaka of Mithila at his court during the occasion of the Bahudakshina Yajna to denote the greatest scholar of Vedas.

In the scholarly contests at the Bahudakshina Yajna, when no one was able defeat the Vedic scholar Yajnavalkya, then he was finally accepted and awarded as Brahmishtha by all the sages, scholars and King Janaka at his court. He established a doctrine on the ultimate principle of release from rebirth by realisation of the identity of self with the ultimate Brahman.

Similarly in the other philosophical text Praśnopaniṣad, the Vedic sage Sukesha, Shaivya, Satyakama, Gargya, Kosala, Bhargava, and Kabandhi Katyayana are mentioned as Brahmishtha.
