= Shakalya =

Vedic scholar from ancient Mithila

Shakalya (IAST: Śākalya) was an ancient Indian grammarian and scholar of the Late Vedic period (c. 700 BCE). His personal name or epithet was Vidagdha ("clever"). Since he was the son of the Vedic sage Śakala, he was also called as Śākalya. Shakalya was a disciple of Satyasri and belonged to the school of Paila. He was a contemporary and rival of Yajnavalkya.

He is supposed to have revised the Vedic texts and written their Pada-pāṭha. He is often quoted by Pāṇini and the writers of the Prātiśākhya, treatises on phonetics. His Padapāṭha of the Rigveda was one of the early attempts in the direction of linguistic analysis; he broke down the samhita text of the Rig Veda into words, identifying even the separate elements of compound words. Indologist Frits Staal has therefore described him as "the first great linguist in human history".

== Brihadaranyaka Upanishad ==
According to Brihadaranyaka Upanishad, he was defeated in a debate with Yajnavalkya at the court of king Janaka of Videha, and his head shattered apart as a result. Regardless of the unverifiable legendary aspects of this incident, the story may reflect the historical rivalry of the two scholars and their respective Vedic schools.

According to the story, once during the Ashvamedha Yajna, king Janaka wanted to know who was the greatest and most knowledgeable brahmana among all those present there. So, he brought a thousand cows, gold, jewels and servants to his court and announced that whoever considered himself the most knowledgeable might come forward and take away all these. A commotion started among the sages who all started debating with each other. Suddenly Yajnavalkya asked his disciples to arrange for taking away all the wealth to his ashrama. Seeing this, the sages challenged him to prove that he is the greatest. Aswala, Uddalaka Aruṇi, Kahola Kaushitaki, Gargi and the others who were present asked him several questions and he answered all of them. Finally, Yajnavalkya told Shakalya that he wanted to give him a chance too. Shakalya asked him several questions related to kama and Yajnavalkya answered all of them. When all his questions ended, Yajnavalkya told Shakalya that now he will ask a question, but there is a condition. If Shakalya cannot answer the question correctly, he will die immediately. Shakalya accepted the challenge. However, when Yajnavalkya asked him a question related to kama, Shakalya did not know the answer and so he died there.
