= Ushasta =

Scholar at Ancient Mithila University

Acharya Ushasta
- उषस्त

Personal life
- Parent: Chakra (father)
- Region: Mithila region
- Education: Ancient Mithila University
- Known for: Shastrartha with Yajnavalkya
- Other name: Ushasta Chakrayana (Ushasta Kakrayana)
- Occupation: Acharya

Religious life
- Religion: Hinduism
- Philosophy: Indian philosophy
- Profession: Indian philosopher
- Fourth Brahmin scholar who debated with Yajnavalkya in the Bahudakshina Yajna at the court of King Janaka

Ushasta (Sanskrit: उषस्त) was a Vedic sage at the court of King Janaka in Mithila. He was the fourth Brahmin scholar at the court of King Janaka, who debated with the sage Yajnavalkya during the occasion of the Bahudakshina Yajna.

== Early life ==
Ushasta was born in a Brahmin family. He was the son of the Vedic sage Chakra.

== Description ==
Ushasta is mentioned in the third chapter of the Indian philosophical text Brihadaranyaka Upanishad. He is mentioned as one of the eight Brahmin scholars who debated with the sage Yajnavalkya. In the text Brihadaranyaka Upanishad, when the Brahmin scholar Bhujyu was not able to defeat the sage Yajnavalkya in the scholarly contest during the occasion of the Bahudakshina Yajna at the court of the King Janaka, then he kept silent. After that the Brahmin scholar Ushasta stood up in the assembly and started Shastrartha with the sage Yajnavalkya.
