= Neti neti =

Sanskrit expression

Neti Neti (Sanskrit : नेति नेति) is a Sanskrit expression which means "not this, not that", or "neither this, nor that" (neti is sandhi from na iti "not so"). It is found in the Upanishads and the Avadhuta Gita and constitutes an analytical meditation helping a person to understand the nature of Brahman by negating everything that is not Brahman. One of the key elements of Jnana Yoga practice is often a "neti neti search". The purpose of the exercise is to negate all objects of consciousness, including thoughts and the mind, and to realize non-dual awareness.

== Significance ==
"Neti neti", is a Vedic expression used as part of a contemplative process to realize the 'nature' or essence (Atman) of existence. With its aid, one negates identification with all things of this world, which is Anatman ("not-Self"). Through a process of elimination, all worldly objects and experiences, including the mind itself are excluded as not-Self until nothing remains but non-graspable existence, which is often reified as 'the Self'. The inquirer thus attains jnana by negating the body, name, form, intellect, senses and all limiting adjuncts and discovers what really is. L. C. Beckett, in her book Neti Neti, explains that the term represents something inexpressible—'suchness' (essence) of that which it refers to when "no other definition applies to it". Neti neti negates all descriptions about existence but not existence itself, annihilating our views of self altogether.

Neti neti is indirectly referenced in Brahma Sutras III.2.22 and was cited by pre-Shankara commentators such as Sabara, Gauḍapada, and Mandana. Adi Shankara was one of the foremost Advaita philosophers who advocated the neti-neti approach. In his commentary on Gaudapada's Karika, Shankara explains that Brahman is free from adjuncts and the function of neti neti is to remove the obstructions produced by ignorance. Shankara's disciple, Sureshvara, further explains that the negation, neti neti, does not have negation as its purpose, it purports identity. The sage of the Brihadaranyaka Upanishad II iii 1–6, beginning with there are two forms of Brahman, the material and the immaterial, the solid and the fluid, the Sat 'being' and tya, 'that' of Satya – which means true, denies the existence of everything other than Brahman. And therefore, there exists no separate entity like Jiva which Shankara states is the reflection of Brahman in Avidya (ignorance).

"Here, then, is the rule of substitution: 'not ____, not ____,' for there is nothing beyond the 'not.'" BU II iii 6

"About this self, one can only say 'not ____, not ____.'" BU IV v 15

Another explanation is in the book Introduction to the Vedārthasangraha of Sri Ramanujacharya by S. S. Raghavachar based on the Vishishtadvaita view:

That the enumerated forms exhaust the forms of Brahman is what is denied in 'neti neti'. Far from denying the forms of Brahman the statement (by Badarayana) asserts the infinity of the forms of Brahman. 'Neti neti' is negative in the letter but embodies a super-abundance of affirmation in spirit.

— Introduction to the Vedārthasangraha of Sri Ramanujacharya

This implies the various possibilities an entity can go through. The fact that a person didn't know the alphabet as a baby is true, but whether s/he will not know it even as an adult depends on the person, who being nothing else but the manifestation of Brahman can become the causation to manifest into a highly literate person or illiterate, whichever personality the person desired for, subject to Karma/causality which is nothing else but Brahman again; Brahman itself being the cause of all Karma.

== Avadhuta Gita ==
The following was extracted from Avadhuta Gita 1.25 on Wikisource:

Sanskrit in Devanagari:
तत्त्वमस्यादिवाक्येन स्वात्मा हि प्रतिपादितः ।
नेति नेति श्रुतिर्ब्रूयाद अनृतं पाञ्चभौतिकम् ।। २५।।

IAST:
tattvamasyādivākyena svātmā hi pratipāditaḥ /
neti neti śrutirbrūyād anṛtaṁ pāñcabhautikam //25//

By such sentences as "That thou art", our own Self is affirmed. Of that which is untrue and composed of the five elements – the Sruti (scripture) says, "Not this, not this."

== See also ==
- Anatta
- Apophatic theology
- Buddha-nature
- Dharmadhatu
- Dharmakāya
- Fana (Sufism)
- I Am that I Am
- Kenosis
- Mahavakya
- Para Brahman
- Śūnyatā
- Tathātā
- Ta'til
