= Uchhaith =

Hindu Ancient Temple in Mithila

Uchchaith Bhagwati Temple
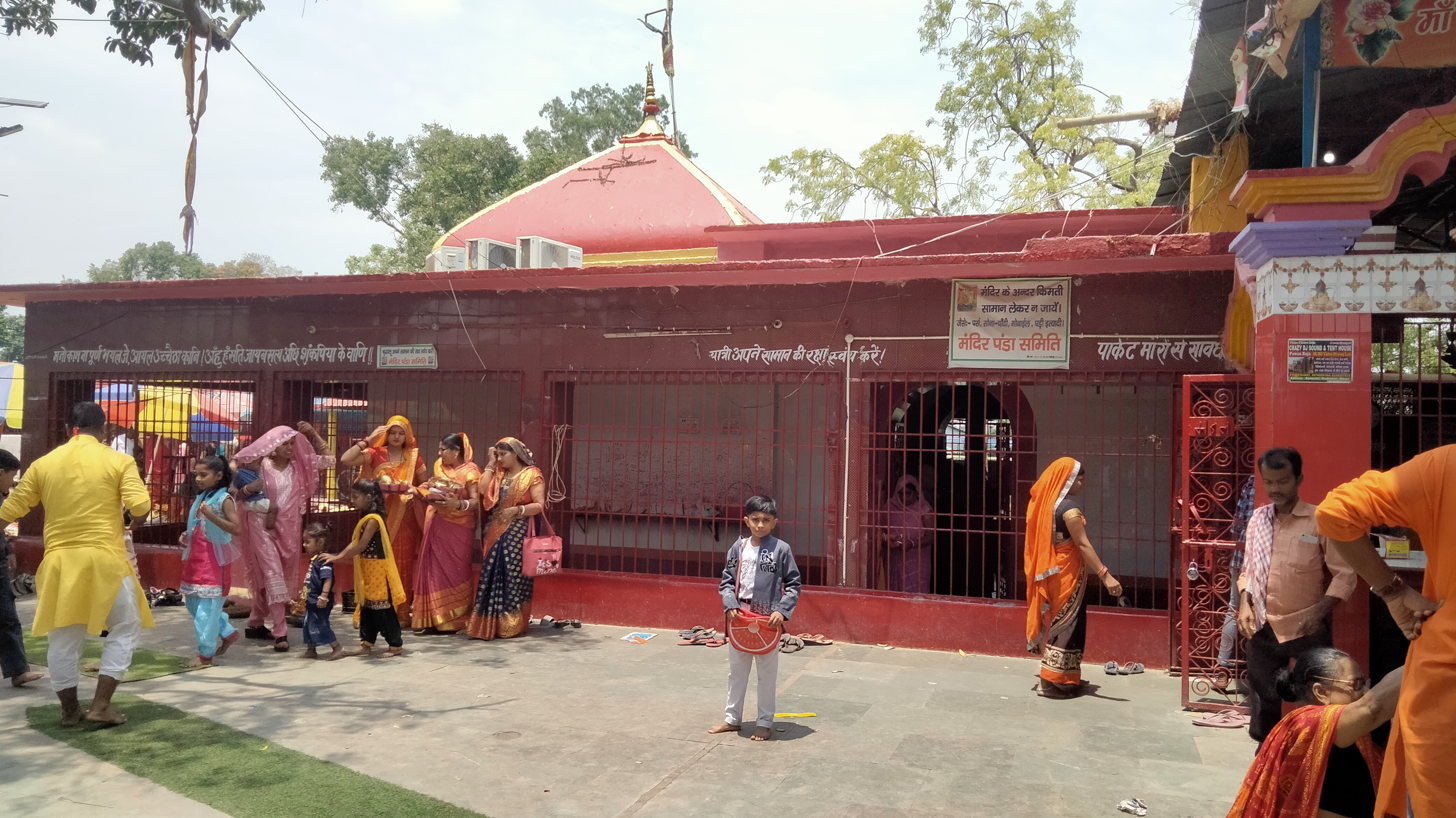
- Uchchaith Bhagawati Mandir, also known as Durga Sthan

Religion
- Affiliation: Hinduism
- District: Madhubani district
- Region: Mithila region
- Deity: Uchchaith Bhagwati
- Festivals: Durga Puja, Bali Pradan, Mundan, Upanayan, Marriage

Location
- Location: Uchchaith, Benipatti, Madhubani district, Mithila region
- State: Bihar
- Country: India
- Interactive map of Uchchaith Bhagwati Temple
- Coordinates: 26.4639763°N 85.8781971°E

Architecture
- Site area: Rural

Uchchaith is a village in Madhubani District, Bihar, India. There is a temple of the Goddess Durga without a head known as Uchchaith Bhagwati in this village. In mythological stories she is known as Banadevi. It is said that many legendary Maharishis have passed through Uchchaith during their journey to the Himalayas or on their way to Janakpur, the capital of Mithila. These include many sages like Maharishi Kapila, Kaṇāda, Gautam, Gemini, Pundarik, Lomas, etc.

== History ==
According to history, the poet Kālidāsa was blessed with all knowledge by Durga. She was impressed by his devotion and dedication. Kalidasa lived here for several years. According to a legend of this area, there was a Sanskrit college in ancient times, which is still present there. Presently the modern college is known as Kalidas Vidyapati Science College. It is said that kalidasa lived there as a servant of the college. There was a river known as Thumhani between the college and the temple.

One day, due to heavy rains, there was a dangerous flood in the river. Students of that college said Kalidasa to cross the river in the evening to light a candle for the goddess Durga temple, which was on the other side of the college, which could be reached after crossing the river. They also asked Kalidasa to mark something by which people could believe that he had lit the candle. Kalidasa crossed the river and burnt a candle. After that, due to lack of knowledge, he started marking on the Goddess's face with black colour. It is said that at that time Goddess Durga appeared and stopped Kalidasa's hand and told Kalidasa, "You are so foolish that you don't know what is right and wrong." Then the goddess asked Kalidasa to seek any boon and anything which he wanted, because Kalidasa was a devotee of Goddess Durga. Kalidasa sought only knowledge; then the Goddess blessed him that whatever book you would touch tonight you would have knowledge of that book. Due to the blessings of Goddess Durga, Kalidasa became a great poet and author of many books and works of literature and became the national poet of India.

== Description ==
Uchchaith Durgasthan is counted among the Shakta pithas, so people come here for Tantric achievements. The idol of the goddess Bhagwati is carved on a black stone. Only the mother's shoulder is visible. She is also known as Chinnamastika Durga because she has no head. The goddess idol has four arms. There is a lotus flower and mace in her left two hands, and the idol of Bajrangbali below it; similarly, a chakra and Trishul in her right two hands and the idol of goddess Kali below that, the shape of a fish below that and the symbol of Chakra on her left foot. Bhagwati is seated in lotus position on top of a lion. There used to be a cremation ground around the pond near the temple. According to legend, sages like King Janaka, Yajnavalkya, Vashishtha, Lord Rama and Vidyapati, etc have performed penance here. Even today, Tantra seekers come here and do penance.

== Ownership of the temple ==
According to the chief priest, Pandit Dev Kumar Giri, the land of the temple was given to him as a donation. He has a survey Khatiyan of the land, so he claimed ownership of the temple. But the Bihar Religious Trust Council claimed that the temple belongs to the public trust. The council asked for an audit of the income and expenditures in the temple to the priest on 7 November 1994. Then the priest challenged the order of the council at Patna High Court. The High Court dismissed the order of the council and directed a rehearing of the matter. After hearing the matter from both sides, the council again made a plan to run the temple, but the priest did not agree with the plan. The priest again filed the case in the high court. Later, the priest took the case back from the Patna High Court and filed the case at the District cum Session Court of Madhubani on 1 March 1997. After 26 years, the district cum session court of Madhubani gave a verdict in favour of the council to take care and maintenance of the temple.

== Gallery ==
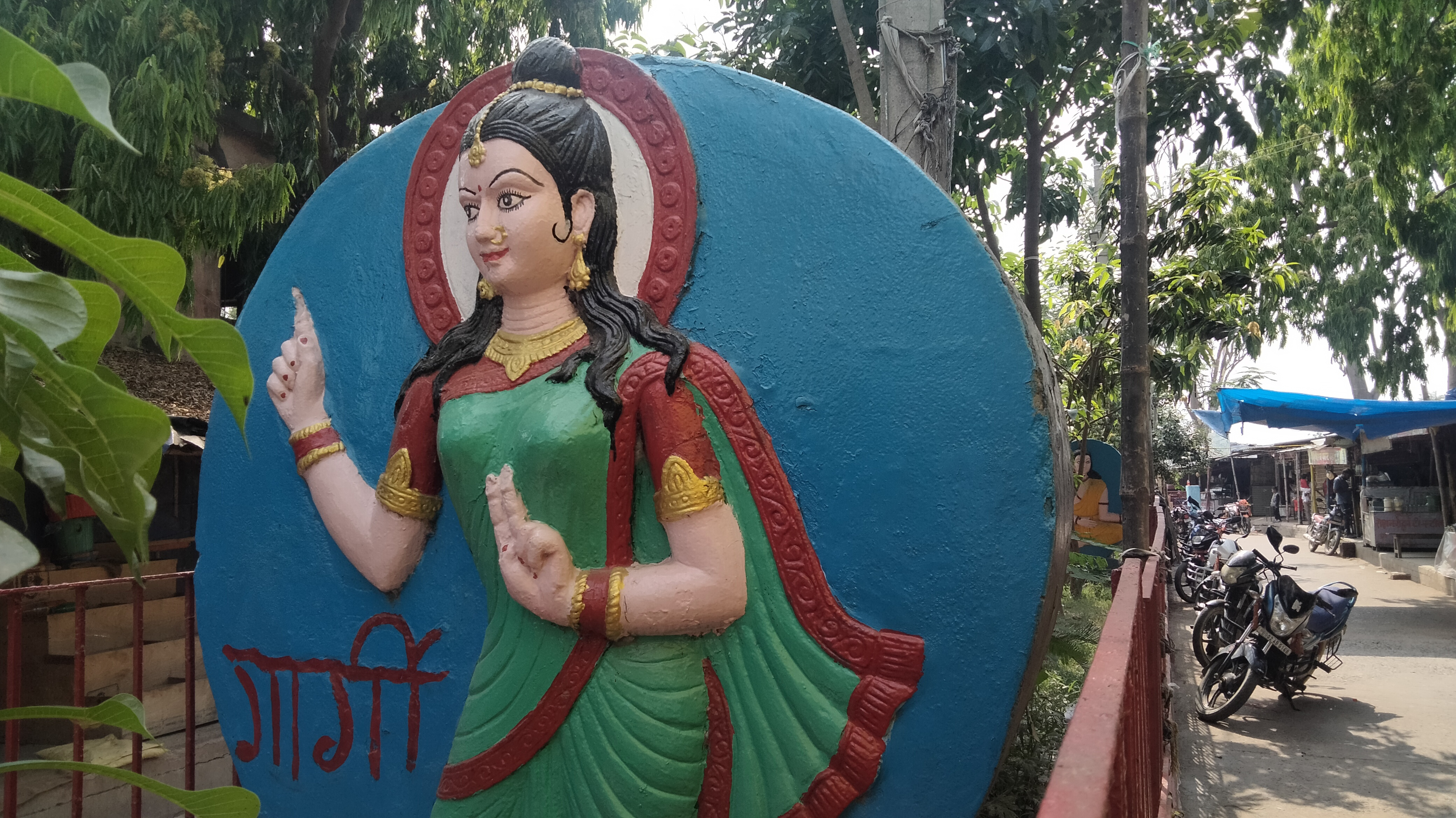
Gargi Vachaknavi statue at the entrance of Uchchaith Bhagawati Mandir.

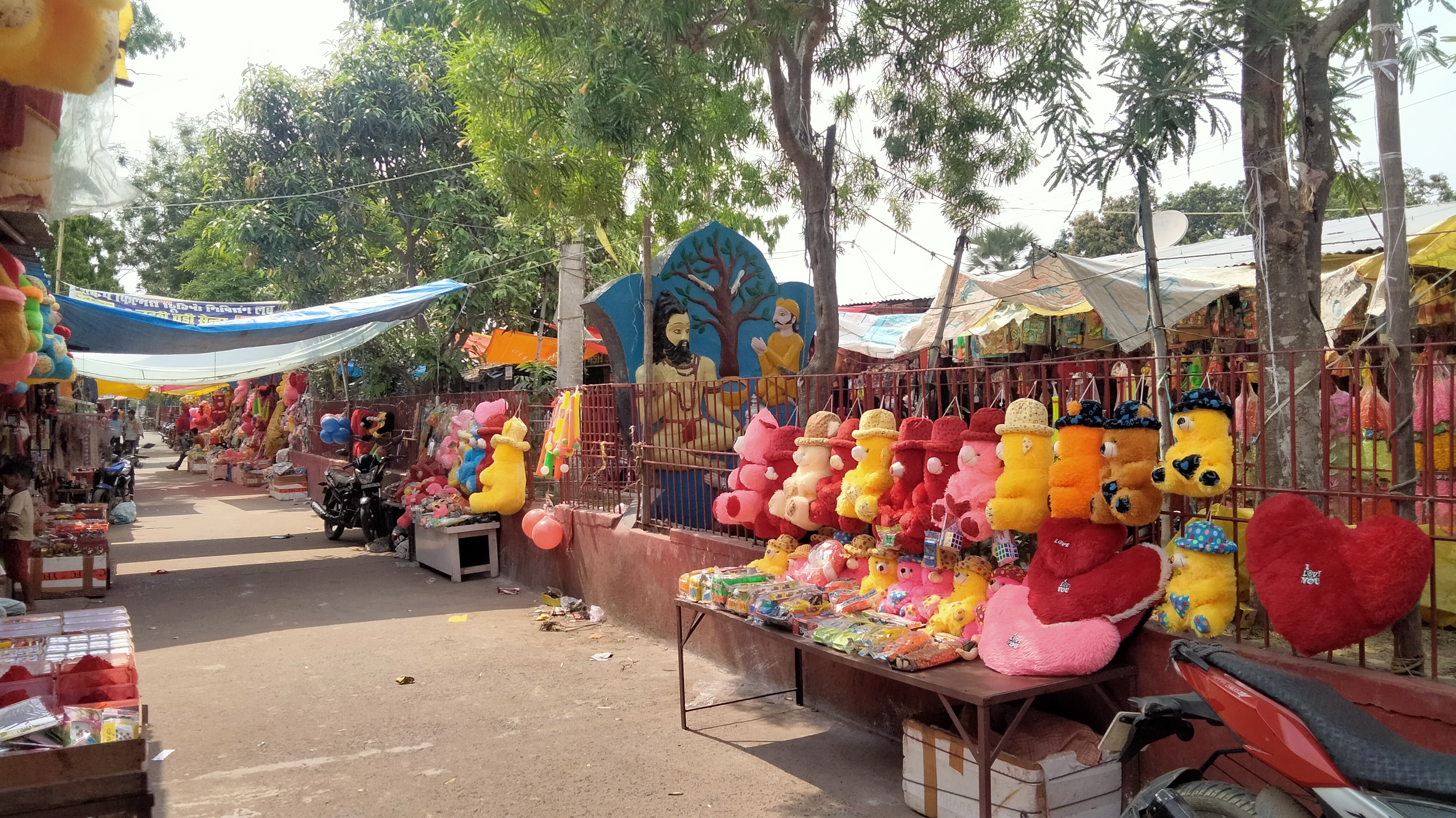
Stalls and shops near the main entrance of the temple complex.

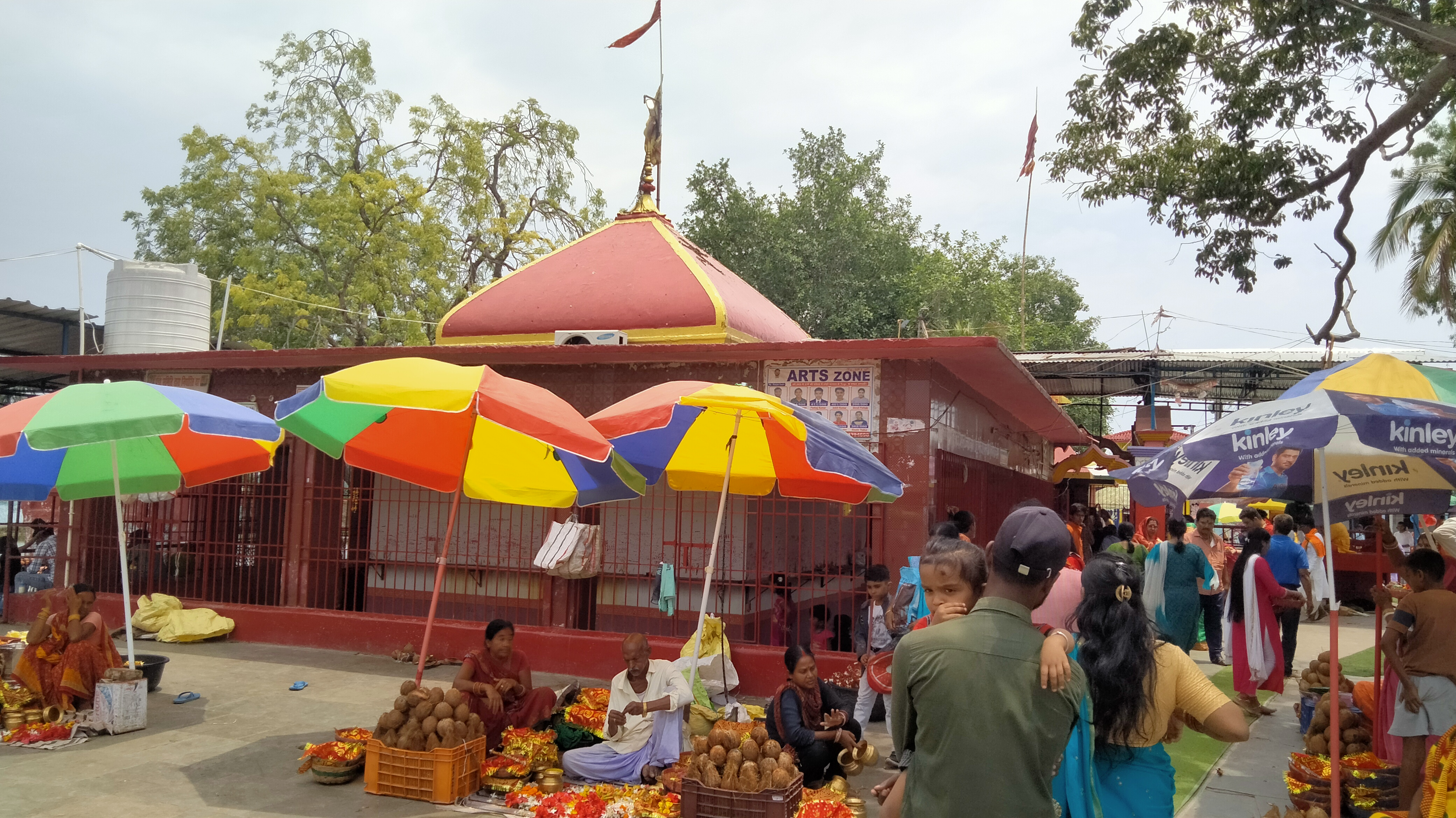
View of Uchchaith Bhagawati Mandir from outside.

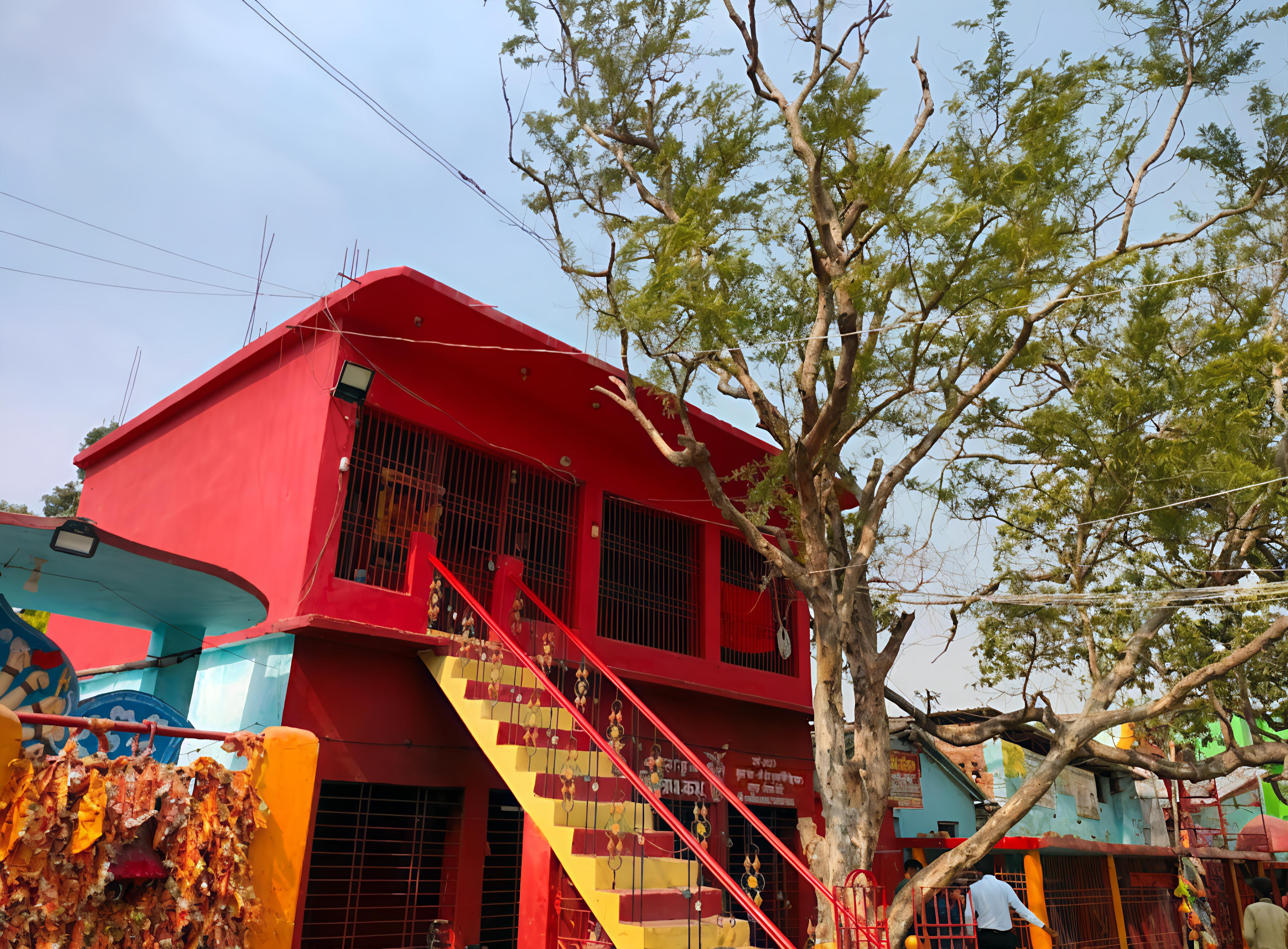
Structure inside the temple premises.

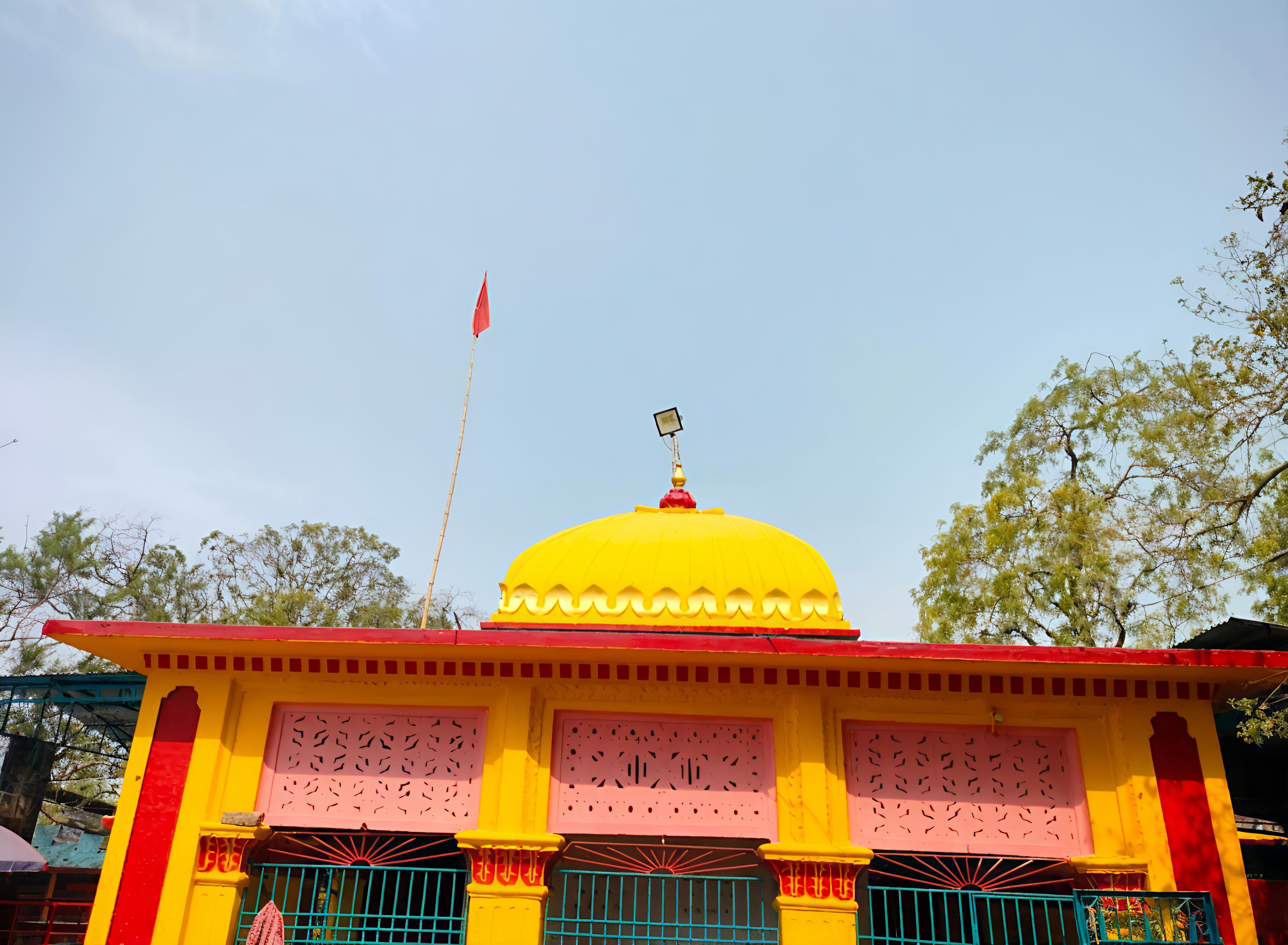
Inner area of the temple showing pathways and small shrines.

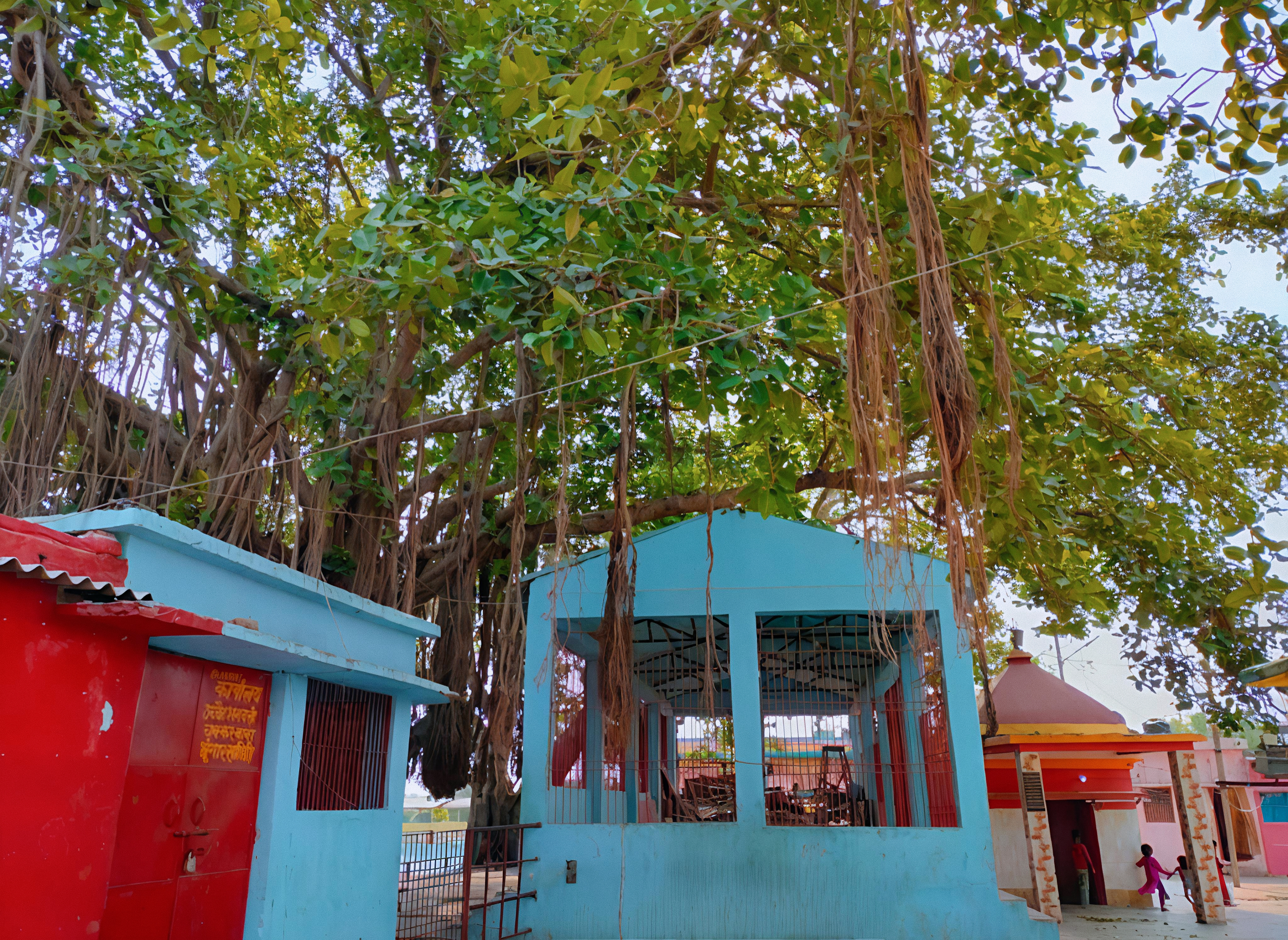
Sacred Banyan tree located within the temple grounds.

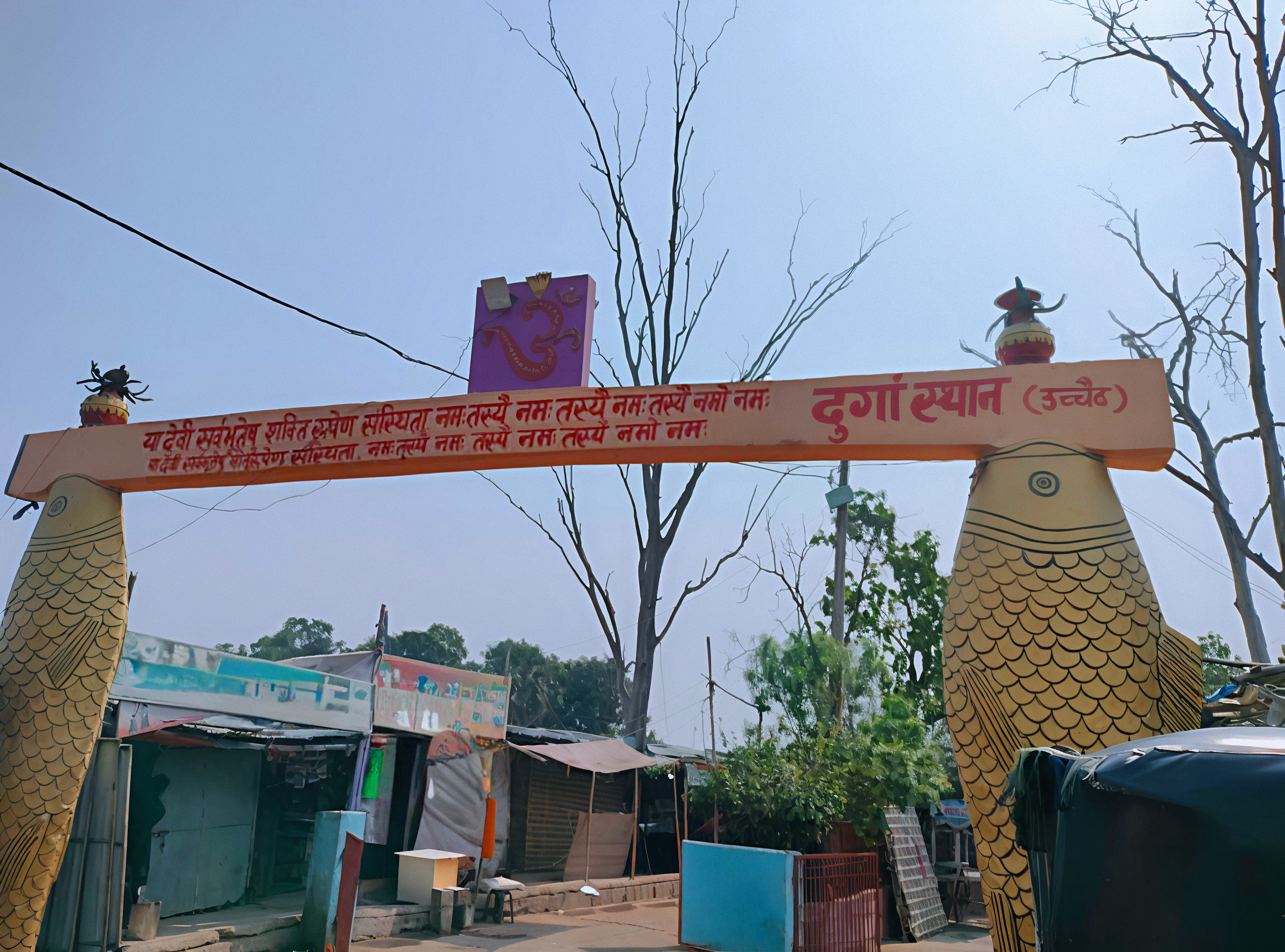
Main entrance gate of Uchchaith Bhagawati Mandir.

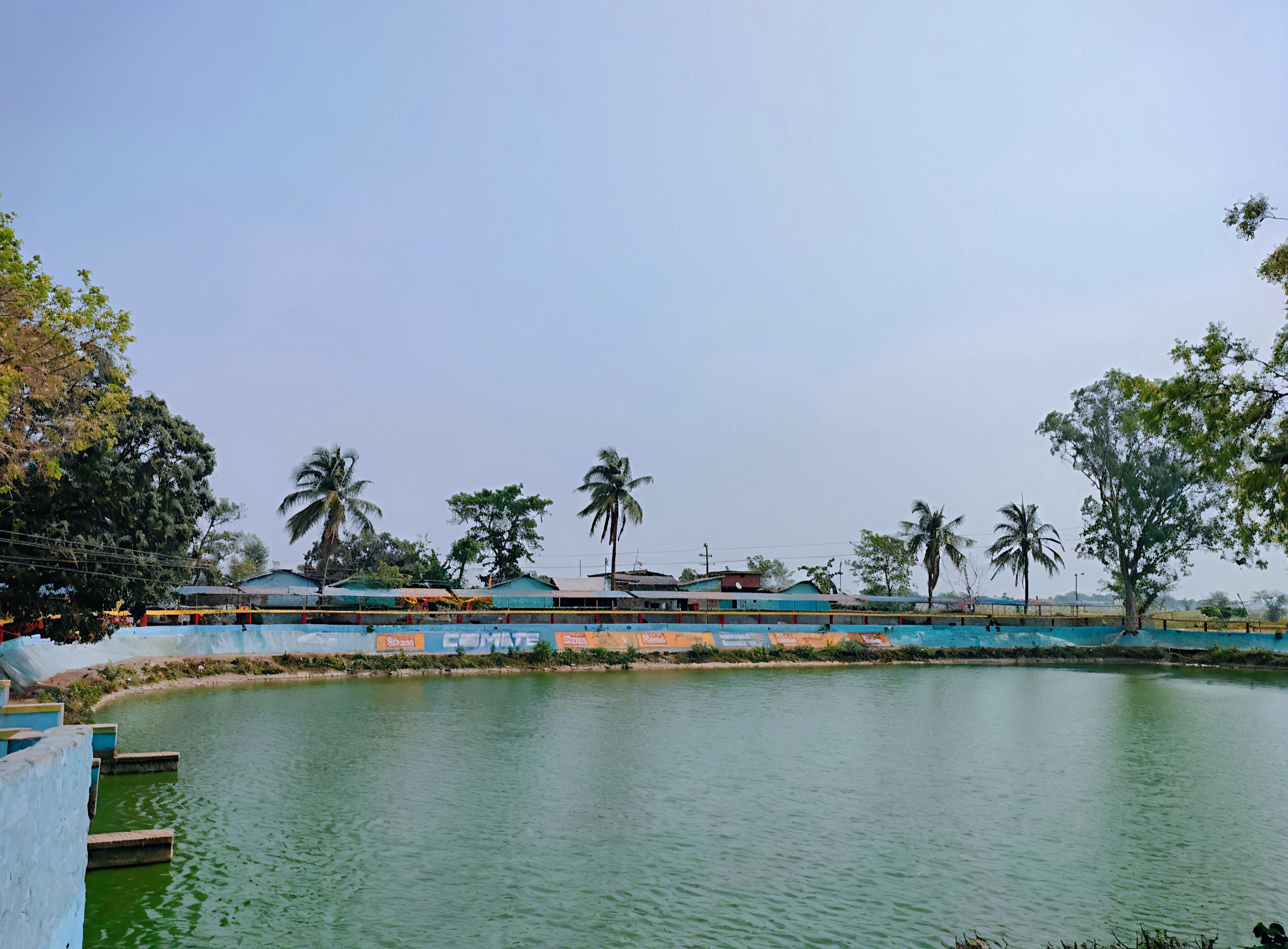
Pond inside the temple complex.

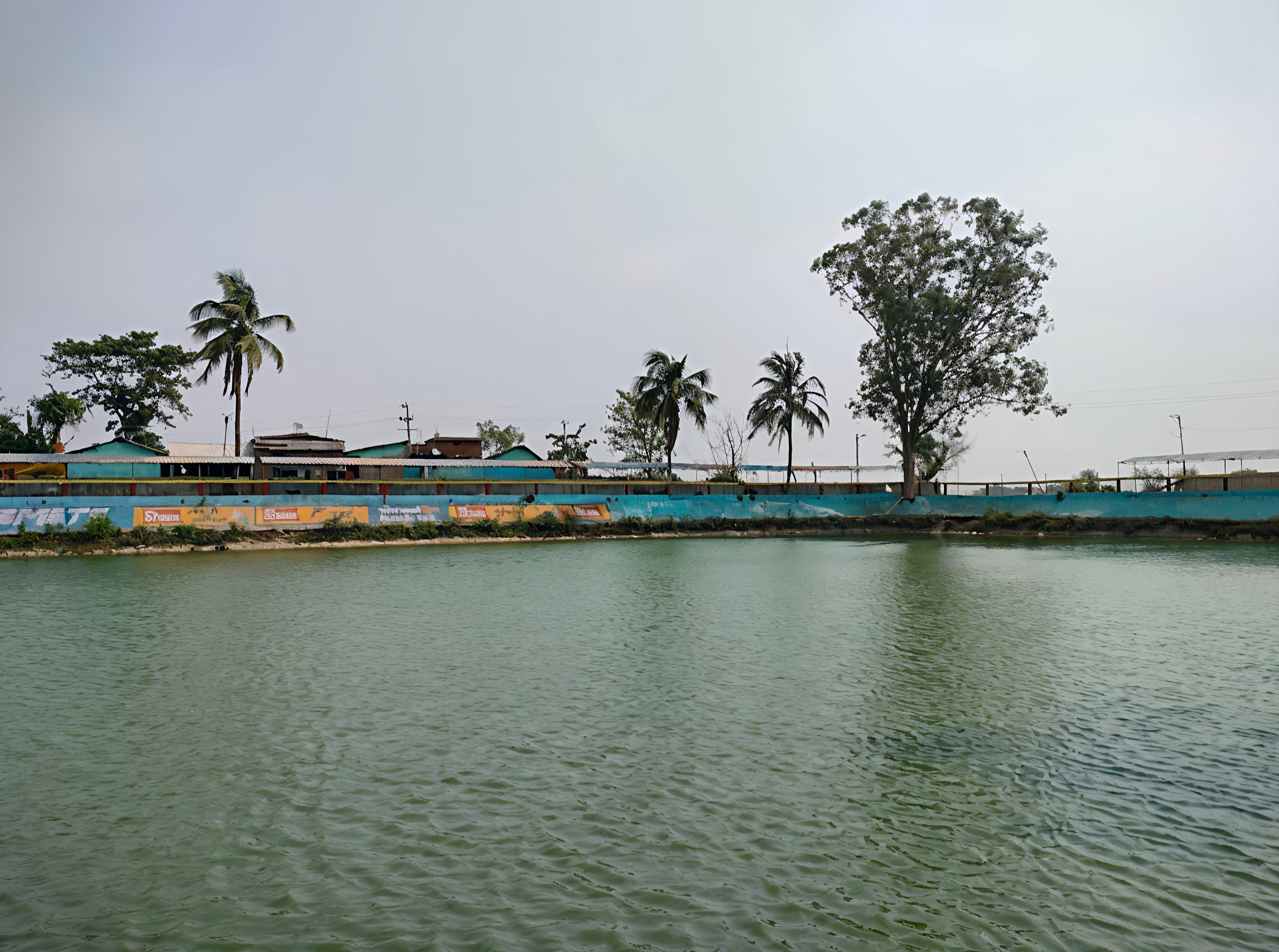
Pond near the temple area.

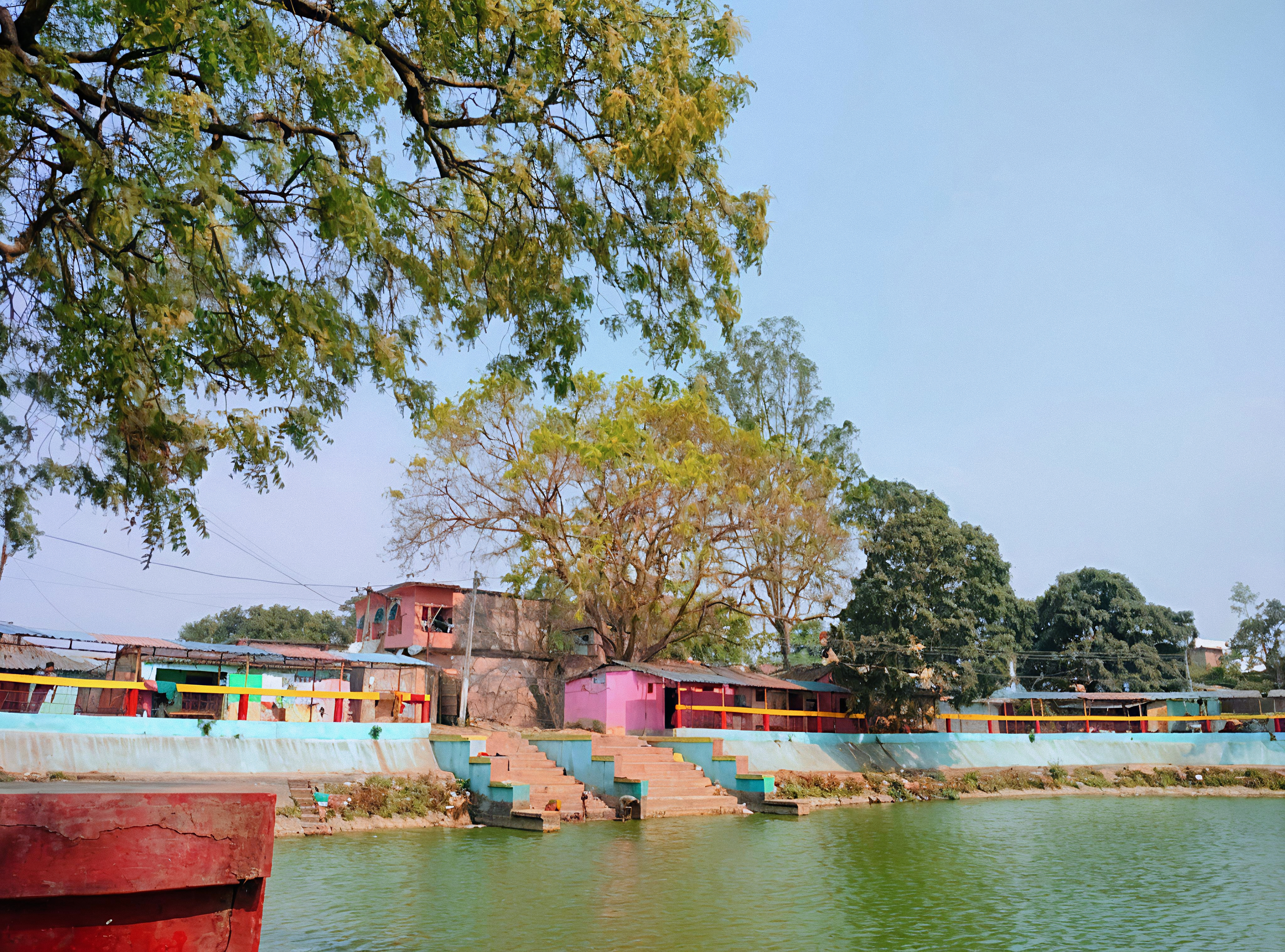
General view of Uchchaith Bhagawati Mandir.

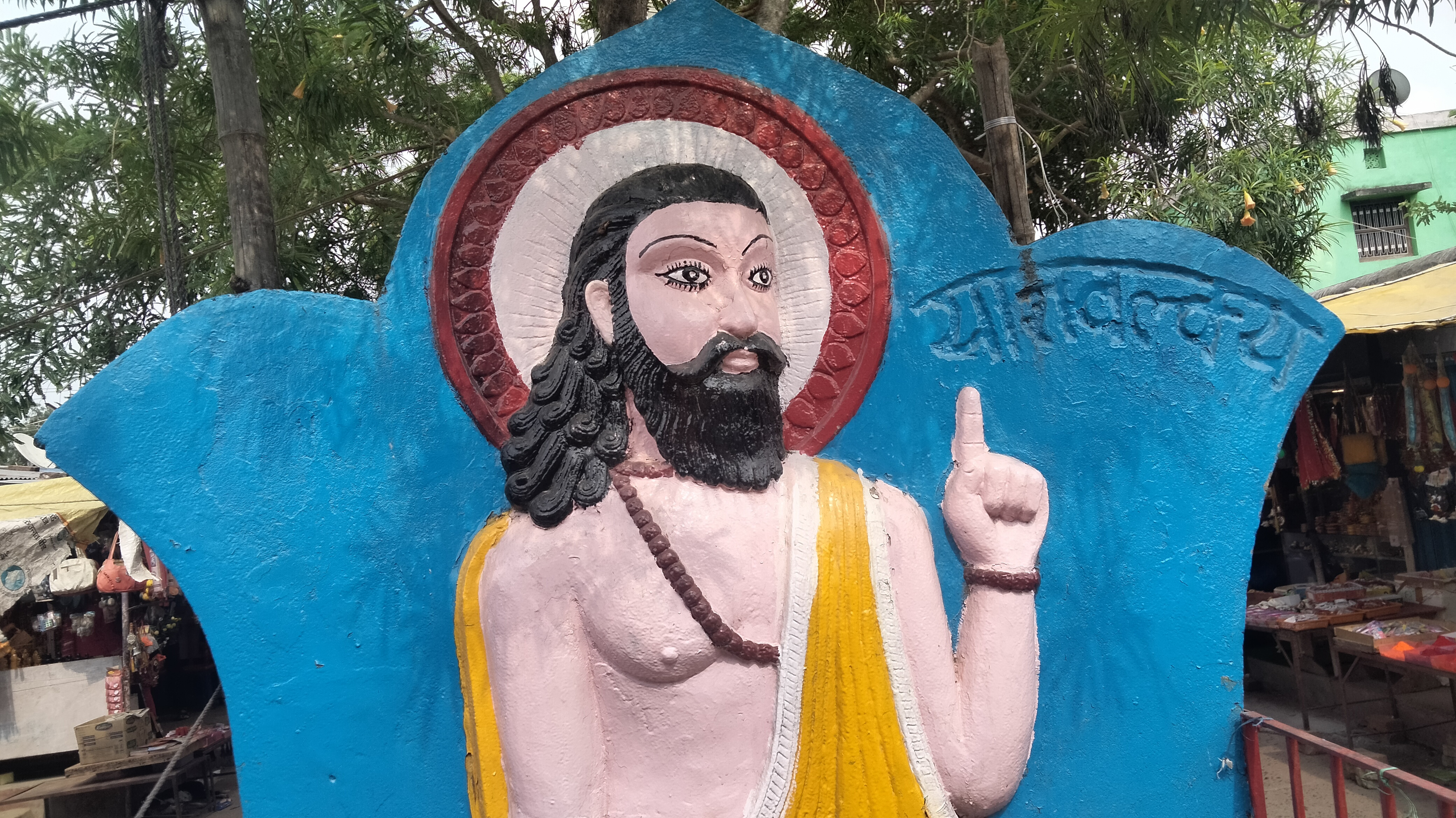
Statue of the Vedic sage Yajnavalkya at the entrance of Uchchaith Bhagawati Mandir Complex

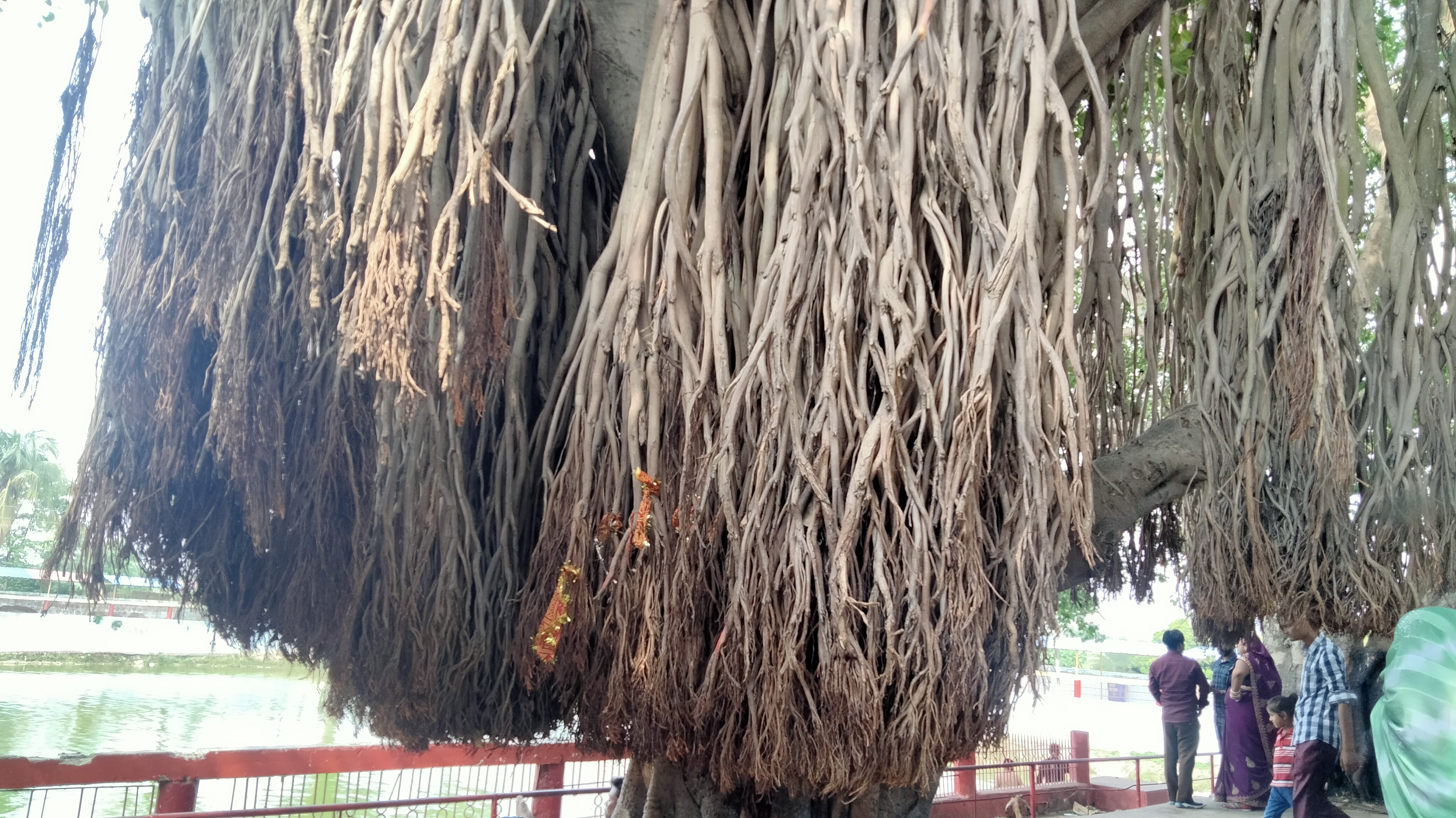
The sacred Banyan tree in the campus of the temple

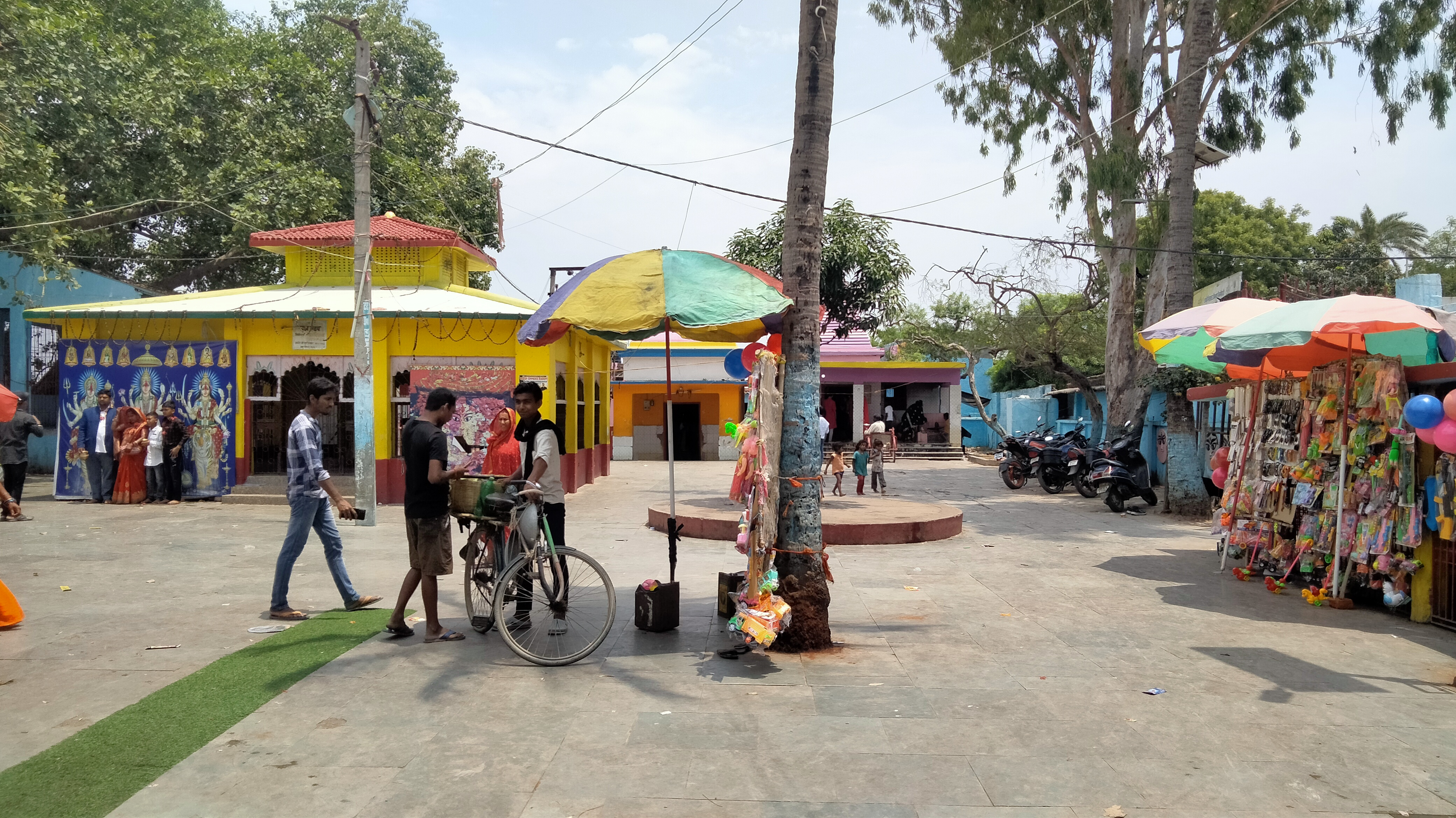
Other temples in the campus of the Uchchaith Bhagawati Mandir

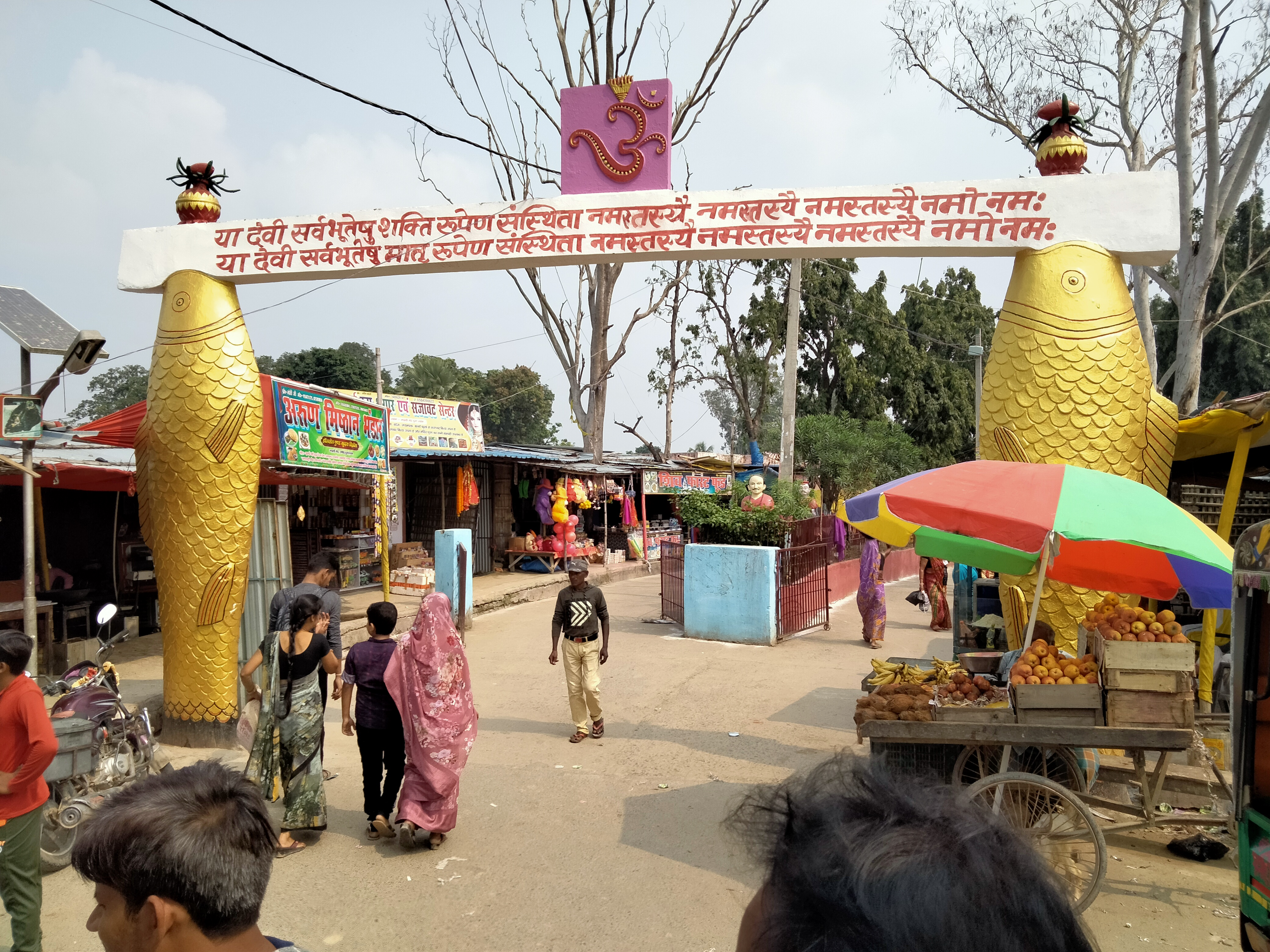
Machh Dwar, Uchchaith Bhagwati, Madhubani

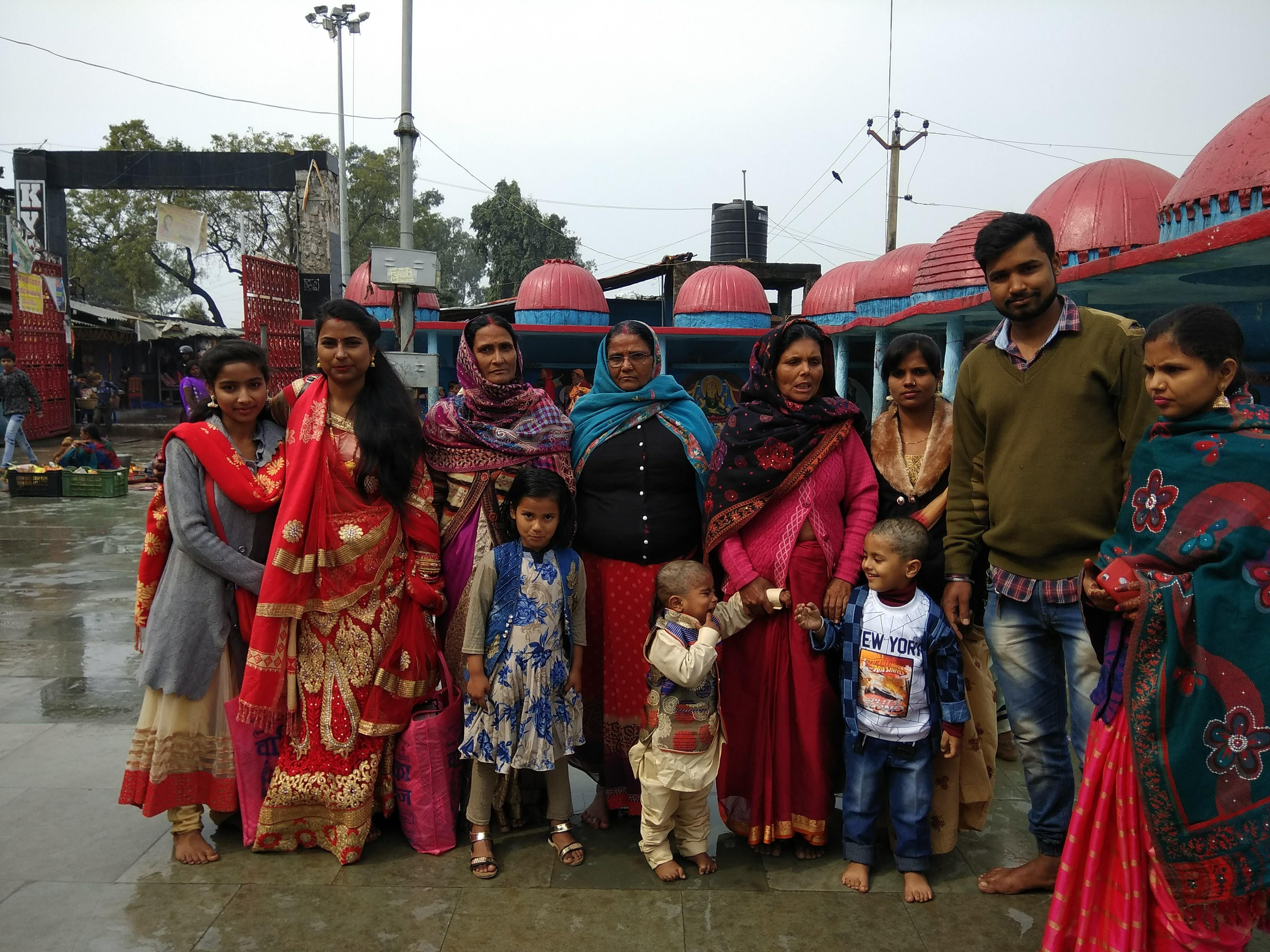
Uchchaith Bhagwati Temple Complex

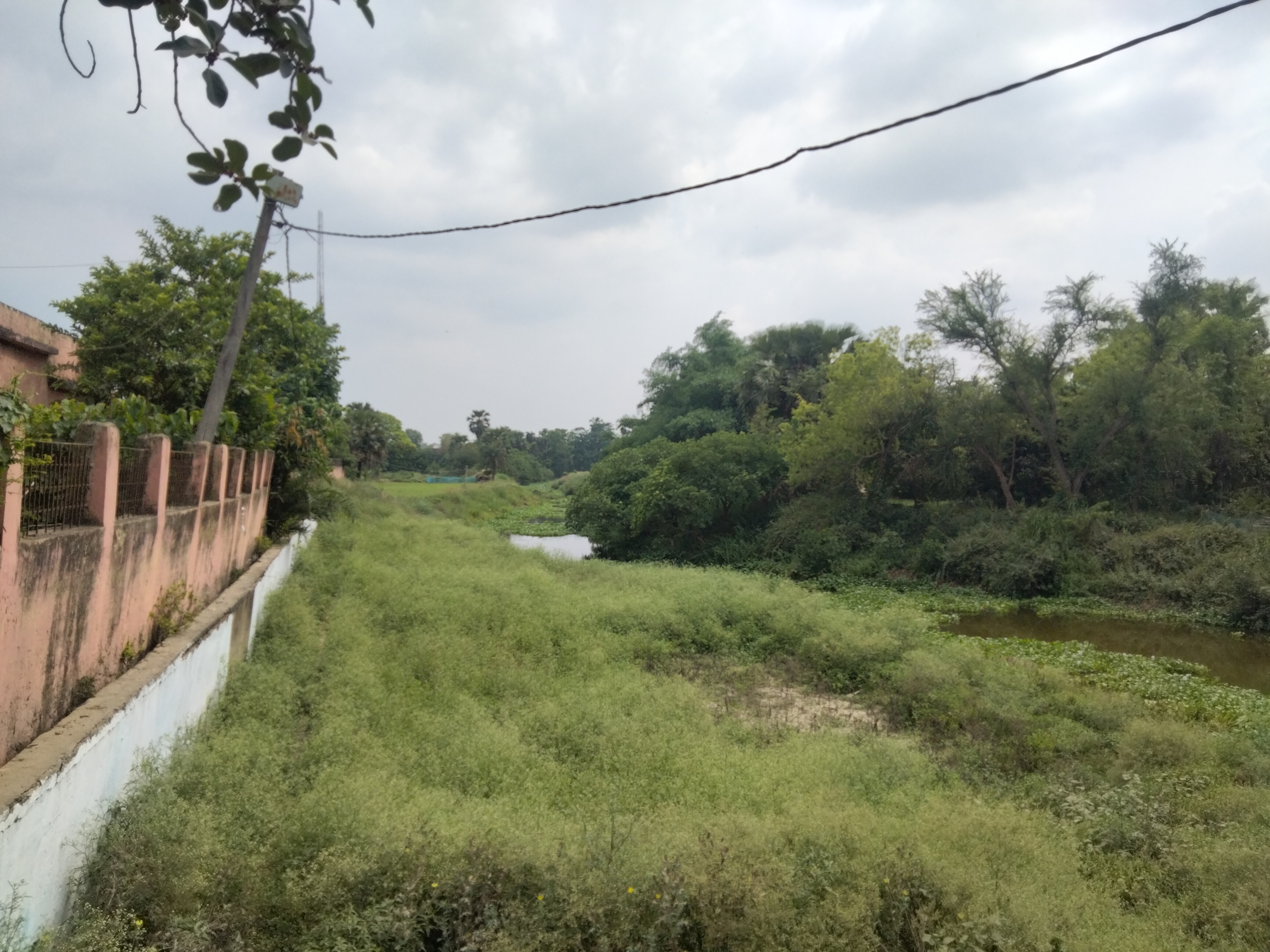
Thumhani River

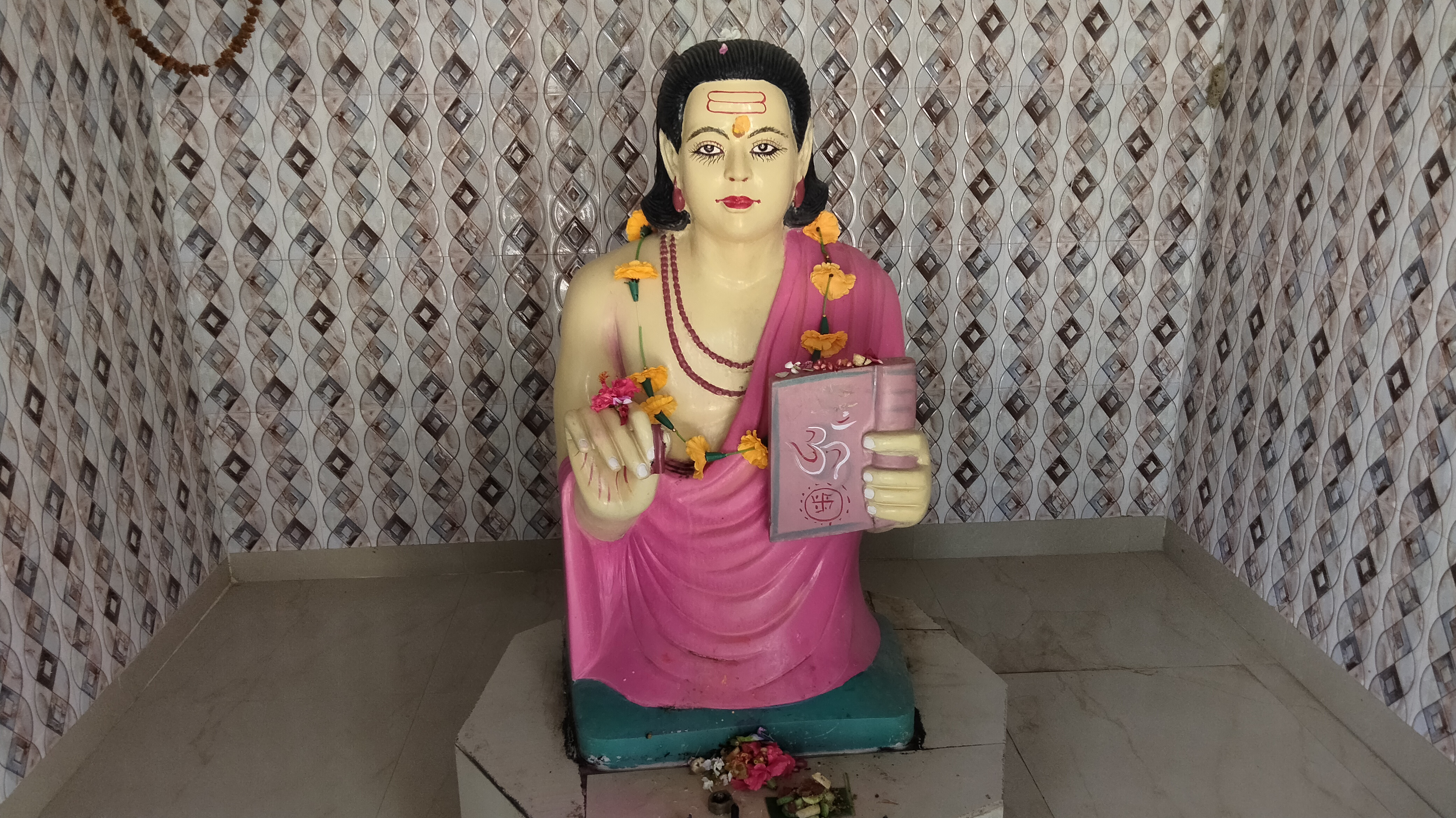
Idol of the poet Kalidasa at the Kalidas Dih near the temple
