= Bhujyu =

Vedic scholar at Ancient Mithila University

- भुज्यु

Personal life
- Region: Mithila region
- Education: Ancient Mithila University
- Known for: Shastrartha with Yajnavalkya
- Occupation: Vedic scholar

Religious life
- Religion: Hinduism
- Profession: Indian philosopher
- Third Brahmin scholar who debated with Yajnavalkya in the Bahudakshina Yajna at the court of King Janaka

Bhujyu (Sanskrit: भुज्यु) was a Vedic sage at the court of the King Janaka in Mithila. He was the third Brahmin scholar who debated with the sage Yajnavalkya in the Bahudakshina Yajna organised by the King Janaka at his court.
