= Upapurana =

Hindu religious texts

The Upapuranas (Sanskrit: Upapurāṇa) are a genre of Hindu religious texts consisting of many compilations differentiated from the Mahapuranas by styling them as secondary Puranas using the prefix Upa (secondary). Though only a few of these compilations originated earlier than most of the extant Mahapuranas, some of these texts are extensive and important.

== Definition and number ==
Similar to the case of the Mahapuranas, a claim has been made in a number of Puranas and Smritis that the Upapuranas are also eighteen in number and give evidence of their knowledge of the existence of a larger number of the Upapuranas. But, unlike the case of the Mahapuranas, the different lists of eighteen Upapuranas seldom agree with one another with regard to the names of these texts. Lists of eighteen Upapuranas occur in a number of texts, which include the Kurma Purana, the Garuda Purana, the Sanatkumara Purana, the Ekamra Purana, the Vāruṇa Purāṇa, the Pārāśara Purāṇa, the Skanda Purana, the Padma Purana, the Aushanasa Purāṇa, Hemadri's Caturvargacintamani and Ballal Sena's Dana Sagara. In spite of the mention of a particular Upapurana in different lists under different names, these lists provide us the names of much more than eighteen texts as the Upapuranas. Brihada Vishnu Purana is a Upapurana mentioned in the list of Upapuranas in the Ekamra Purana. Its original manuscript has been lost. In fact, by examining all the Sanskrit texts which mention the names of these texts, the actual number of the Upapuranas are found to be near a hundred, including those mentioned in the different lists. But, it can not be denied that many of these texts have been lost without leaving any trace.

== Major Upapuranas ==
Sl. No.	Upapurana name	Chapters number	Status	Comments
01	Sanat-kumara Purāṇa	19 chapters	Published	It is narrated by Sanatkumāra.
02	Nārasimha Purāṇa	68 chapters	Published	It discusses Vishnu's Narasimha incarnation.
03	Nānda Purāṇa	52 chapters	Unpublished, manuscript available	It is narrated by Nandi.
04	Śivadharma Purāṇa	24 chapters	Published	It talks about Śaivaism and Śaktism.
05	Samba Purana	84 chapters	Published	It is narrated by Durvāsā.
06	Nāradīya Purāṇa	38 chapters	Published	It is narrated by Nārada.
07	Kāpila Purāṇa	21 chapters	Published	It discusses Kapila's Samkhya Philosophy.
08	Mānava Purāṇa		Manuscript unavailable	It is narrated by Manu.
09	Auśanasa Purāṇa		Unpublished, Manuscript unavailable	It is narrated by Uśanā.
10	Mudgala Purana		Vulgate Published By Choukhamba, Manuscript unavailable	It discusses about Ganesha.
11	Vāruṇa Purāṇa	12 chapters	Published	It is narrated by Varuṇa.
12	Kālikā Purāṇa	98 chapters	Published	It discusses about Pārvatī.
13	Māheśvara Purāṇa	12 chapters	Unpublished, manuscript available	It discusses Shiva and Parvati's family and all deities.
14	Ganesha Purana	84 chapters	Published	It narrates about Ganesha.
15	Saura Purāṇa	69 chapters	Published	It discusses Shiva and Parvati's family and all deities.
16	Parāshara Purāna	18 chapters	Published	It is narrated by Parashara.
17	Vishnudharmottara Purana	15 chapters	Published	It is narrated by Brahma.
18	Bhārgava Purāṇa	40 chapters	Published	Its narrated by Vaśiṣṭha.

== Sthala, Kula, and Minor Upapuranas ==
They are called Atipuranas.

1. Bṛihaddharma Purāṇa
2. Gaṇeśa Purāṇa
3. Mudgala Purāṇa
4. Kālki Purāṇa
5. Ṣivarahasya Purāṇa
6. Kriyāyogasāra Purāṇa
7. Yuga Purāṇa
8. Lakṣmi Purāṇa
9. Bhaviśyottara Purāṇa
10. Devānga Purāṇa
11. Śiva Purāṇa
12. Nīlamata Purāṇa
13. Malla Purāṇa
14. Basava Purāṇa
15. Periya Purāṇam
16. Dharma Purāṇa
17. Mahābhāgavata Purāṇa
18. Viṣṇudharma Purāṇa
19. Kārtava Purāṇa
20. Ṛju Purāṇa
21. Pāśupati Purāṇa
22. Ekāmra Purāṇa
23. Pārānanda Purāṇa
24. Dattātreya Purāṇa
25. Viśvakarma Purāṇa
26. Vāsuki Purāṇa
27. Ātma Purāṇa
28. Caṇḍī Purāṇa
29. Bhairava Purāṇa
30. Viṣṇurahasya Purāṇa
31. Śukra Purāṇa
32. Kubera Purāṇa
33. Sarasvati Purāṇa
34. Govinda Purāṇa
35. Bhūgola Purāṇa

== Sectarian divisions ==
Unlike the Mahapuranas, most of the Upapuranas have been able to preserve their older materials along with their distinctive sectarian character. All extant Upapuranas can be broadly divided into six groups according to the sectarian views found in these texts: Vaishnava, Shakta, Shaiva, Saura, Ganapatya and non-sectarian.

=== Vaishnava Upapuranas ===
The most significant texts among the Vaishnava Upapuranas are the Manava Purana, the Vishnudharmottara Purana, the Narasimha Purana, the Naradiya Purana and the Kriyayogasara.

The extant Narasimha Purana comprises 68 chapters. The extant Vishnudharma Purana comprises 105 chapters.

=== Shakta Upapuranas ===
Among the Shakta Upapuranas, the most important extant texts are the Kalika Purana, the Mahabhagavata Purana and the Chandi Purana.

The extant Kalika Purana comprises 98 chapters.

=== Shaiva Upapuranas ===
The notable Shaiva Upapuranas are the Saura Purana, the Shivadharmapurva Purana, the Shivadharmottara Purana, the Shivarahasya Purana, the Ekamra Purana, the Parashara Purana, the Varuna Purana, and the Maheshvara Purana.

The extant Saura Purana comprises 69 chapters. The extant Parashara Upapurana consists of 18 chapters. The extant Shivadharma Purana comprises 24 chapters and deals only with the religious rites and duties of the worshippers of Shiva. It mentions itself as a shastra or dharmashastra.

=== Saura Upapuranas ===
The only extant text which can be called an exclusive Saura Purana is the Samba Purana. It comprises 84 chapters.

=== Ganapatya Upapuranas ===
Only two extant Upapuranas profess the views of the Ganapatya sect. These are the Mudgala Purana and the Ganesha Purana.

=== Non-sectarian Upapuranas ===
The Upapuranic works, which do not profess any particular sectarian views are the Bhavishyottara Purana, the Kapila Purana and the Brihaddharma Purana.

== Scholarship ==
Dr. R. C. Hazra's magnum opus for which he earned a D. Litt was a detailed catalogue of contents, comparison of manuscripts of Upapuranas; popularly known as Studies in the Upapurāṇas. It was series of five volumes of equal length, a part of the Calcutta Sanskrit College Research Series (out of which only two were published by Munshiram Manoharlal, both generally edited by Gaurinath Sastri and Hazra's handwritten papers of the other three volumes are kept with the College); on a descriptive study of all more than hundred Upapuranas, which, even to this day, remains an important but ignored field of Sanskrit literature.
