= Vishnudharmottara Purana =

Minor Purana of Hinduism

The Vishnudharmottara Purana (or the Vishnudharmottara) is a Hindu Sanskrit text in the Upapuranas genre. Like the Mahapuranas, it is also encyclopedic covering a wide range of topics in the traditions of Hinduism. It is included in the list of eighteen Upapuranas given in the Brihaddharma Purana (1.25.23-26).

== Content ==
The Vishnudharmottara Purana is a Vaishnava-tradition text. It includes mythology and dharma legends, has sections on cosmology, cosmogony, geography, astronomy, astrology, division of time, genealogies (mostly of kings and sages), manners and customs, charity, penances, law and politics, war strategies, medicines and their preparation for human beings and animals, cuisine, grammar, metrics, lexicography, metrics, rhetoric, dramaturgy, dance, vocal and instrumental music, and arts.

=== On painting (Citrasūtra) ===
The Viṣṇudharmottara Purāṇa is perhaps best known for the section on painting, called the Citrasūtra, constituting chapters 35–43 of the third section of the overall work. This much cited part of the text dates from the Gupta period of Indian history. This section of the work is supported by manuscripts all over India and Nepal, written in Devanagari, Sharada, Bengali, and Newari writing systems. This compilation was likely complete by the 5th or 6th-century CE according to David Pingree. It is one of the oldest known complete Sanskrit treatises on painting arts in India.

The extant text is divided into three parts or sections (khaṇḍas). The first section comprises 269 chapters (adhyayas), the second section comprises 183 chapters and the third section comprises 118 chapters.

=== The third section (khaṇḍa) ===
Chapter 1 deals with the origin of image-making and the interdependence of arts.

Chapters 2-17 deal with grammar, lexicography, metrics, and rhetoric.

Chapters 18-19 deal with vocal and instrumental music.

Chapters 20-34 deal with dance and dramaturgy.

Chapters 35-43 survey the various branches, methods, and ideals of Indian painting. The engages not only with its religious aspect but also, and to a far greater extent, with its secular uses. It "proclaims the joy that colours and forms and the representation of things seen and imagined produce". This aphoristic treatise on painting has attracted much commentary (bhāṣya ) literature in Hinduism over the centuries. The text, or portions of it, has been translated in English by Stella Kramrisch, C Sivaramamurti, Parul Mukherji, and Isabella Nardeli.

Chapters 44-85 deal with iconography (Skt. pratimalakshana).

Chapters 86-93 deal with temple construction.

Chapters 94-108 deal with the induction of deities into images (Skt. avahana).

Chapters 109-118 deal with rites and rituals.

Stella Kramrisch argues that while the Vishnu Purana cannot predate the second half of the 4th century CE, the chapters of the Vishnudharmottara dealing with painting were likely compiled in the 7th century CE.

== Bibliography ==
- Agarwal, O.P. (1969). "A study on the techniques of Indian wall paintings". Journal of Indian Museums. 25–26.
- Hazra, Rajendra Chandra (1962). "The Puranas". In Radhakrishnan, S. (ed.). The Cultural Heritage of India. Vol. 2. Calcutta: The Ramakrishna Mission Institute of Culture. ISBN 81-85843-03-1.
- Kramrisch, Stella (1928). The Vishnudharmottara: Part 3, Treatise on Indian Painting and Image-Making (Reprinted ed.). University of Calcutta Press. ISBN 978-1-294-66170-2.
- Mukherji, Parul Dave, ed. (2001). विष्णुधर्मोत्तरपुराणीयं चित्रसूत्रम् [The Citrasutra of the Vishnudharmottara Purana]. Motilal Banarsidass Publishers. ISBN 978-81-208-1805-7.
- Nardi, Isabella (2007). The Theory of Citrasutras in Indian Painting: A Critical Re-evaluation of their Uses and Interpretations. Routledge. ISBN 978-1-134-16523-0.
- Thakur, Laxman S. (1985). "The Temple of Basesar Mahadeva at Bajaura: Application of the "Vishnudharmottara Purana"". Proceedings of the Indian History Congress. 46: 679–691. ISSN 2249-1937. JSTOR 44141419.
- Shah, Priyabala (1958). Vishnudharmottara-Purana: Third Khanda. Vol. 2. Baroda: Oriental Institute.
- Vatsyayan, Kapila (1963). "Notes on the Relationship of Music and Dance in India". Ethnomusicology. 7 (1): 33–38. doi:10.2307/924145. JSTOR 924145.
