= Bhargava Purana =

Minor Purana of Hinduism

Bhargava Purana (Sanskrit: भार्गव पुराण, romanized: Bhārgava Purāṇa) is one of the Upapuranas, the 18 minor Puranas in Hinduism.

== Contents ==
It contains 114 chapters which foretells about the 12 devotees of Vishnu.
