= Naradiya Purana =

Sanskrit scripture, One of the eighteen major Puranas

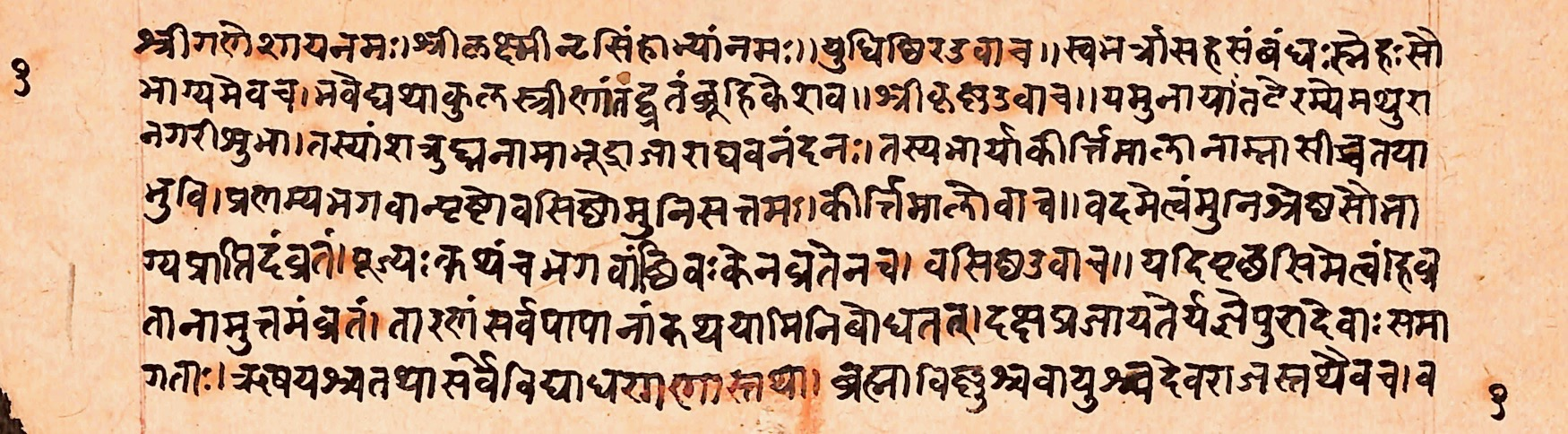
A page from a Naradiya Purana manuscript (Sanskrit, Devanagari)

The Naradiya Purana (Sanskrit: नारदीय पुराण, Naradiya Purana) or Narada Purana (Sanskrit: नारद पुराण), are two Vaishnavism texts written in Sanskrit language. One of the texts is termed as a Major Purana, also called a Mahapurana, while the other is termed as a Minor Purana (Upapurana), also referred as Brihannaradiya Purana.

Unlike most Puranas that are encyclopedic, the Brihannaradiya text is focussed almost entirely on Vishnu worship, while the Naradiya text is a compilation of 41 chapters (20%) on Vishnu-worship and rest of the chapters (80%) cover a wide range of topics including a large compilation of Mahatmya (travel guides) to temples and places along the river Ganges and neighbouring regions.

The Naradiya Purana is notable for dedicating eighteen chapters on other Puranas, one entire chapter summarizing each Major Purana. It is also notable for its verses extolling Buddha in chapter 1.2.

== History ==
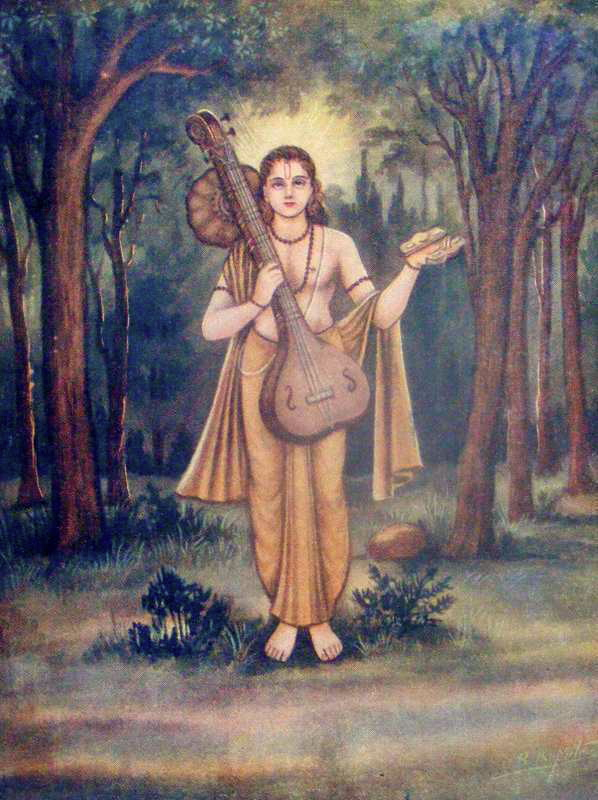
The text is named after the Vedic sage Narada, the musical genius and monk who also appears in numerous Upanishads.

Manuscripts of nearly all the major puranas acknowledge the existence of a major purana named either Narada or Naradiya, suggesting it was an important text in Hindu mythology. Yet, unlike other Puranas which either appear in the major or minor purana lists, the Naradiya text appears in both lists. This caused significant confusion to 19th and early 20th century Indologists. The confusion was compounded by the fact that the content of the text manuscripts they found seemed to follow similar scope and focus, except that the Brihannaradiya Purana text with about 3,500 verses was slightly bigger than the other with about 3,000 verses.

Later discovered manuscripts and scholarship established that the Narada or Naradiya is the major purana, Brihannaradiya is the Upapurana. The Naradiya Purana consists of two bhagas (parts), with the first called Purvabhaga and second called Uttarabhaga. The Purvabhaga has four padas with the total of 125 chapters. The Uttarabhaga has 82 chapters, which embeds the Rukmangada-carita.

The Brihannaradiya Purana has no parts or padas, and a total of 38 adhyayas (chapters).

The Naradiya Purana texts, like other Puranas, exist in numerous versions, but with less variation than other Puranas. Wilson states that both texts are of likely recent composition, probably 16th or 17th century, because the five manuscripts he reviewed had verses mentioning certain events after Islamic invasion and control of the Indian subcontinent. The other unusual part of the manuscripts he examined, states Wilson, is that the descriptions of ritual worship of Vishnu in the text are "puerile inventions, wholly foreign to the more ancient" ideas in the Purana genre of Hindu texts.

Rajendra Hazra, in contrast, states that the core verses of the texts were likely first composed over various centuries, as follows: he dates the Vishnu-bhakti focussed text Brihannaradiya Purana to the 9th-century; he places the first 41 chapters of Purvabhaga and the first 37 chapters of Uttarabhaga to have been composed before the 11th century; and, the rest he states is of likely a comparatively later origin. The Naradiya Purana, states Hazra, was likely composed after the Brihannaradiya Purana. It is unknown, adds Hazra, whether the extant manuscripts of the Naradiya Puranas are same as the 9th and 10th-century originals, but we know that the verses quoted in medieval Hindu Smriti texts with these texts cited as source, are missing from the currently surviving manuscripts.

Rocher states that the composition date of each Purana remains unclear. Dimmitt and van Buitenen state that it is difficult to ascertain when, where, why and by whom the major and minor Puranas were written:

As They Exist Today, The Puranas Are A Stratified Literature. Each Titled Work Consists Of Material That Has Grown By Numerous Accretions In Successive Historical Eras. Thus, No Purana Has A Single Date Of Composition. (...) It Is As If They Were Libraries To Which New Volumes Have Been Continuously Added, Not Necessarily At The End Of The Shelf, But Randomly.

— Cornelia Dimmitt and J.A.B. van Buitenen, Classical Hindu Mythology: A Reader in the Sanskrit Puranas

The Padma Purana categorizes Naradiya Purana as a Sattva Purana (which represents goodness and purity). Scholars consider the Sattva-Rajas-Tamas classification as "entirely fanciful" and there is nothing in this text that actually justifies this classification.

== Contents ==
=== Brihannaradiya Purana ===
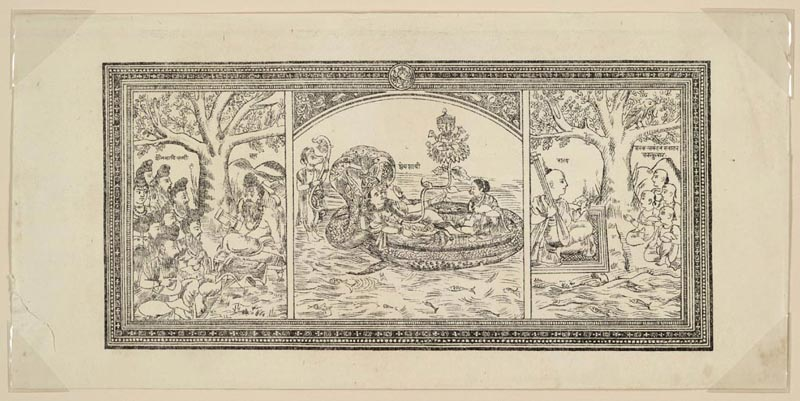
The Naradiya Purana cover from 19th century.

The Brihannaradiya Purana (also Brihannarada Purana) is focussed on bhakti (devotion) towards Vishnu. It describes the festivals and ritual ceremonies of Vaishnavism. Many chapters of the text are part of the Mahatmya, glorifying the river Ganges, pilgrimage and travel centers such as the Prayāga (the confluence of the rivers Yamuna and Ganges), and Kashi (a sacred city). The text also includes chapters on ethics and duties of members of various varnas and ashramas, vratas, and summaries on the samskaras.

=== Naradiya Purana ===
The Narada Purana (also Naradiya Purana) follows the style of the Brihannaradiya Purana in the first 41 chapters of Purvabhaga, but the rest of the first part and second part are encyclopedic covering a diverse range of topics. The encyclopedic sections discuss subjects such as the six Vedangas, moksha, dharma, adhyatma-jnana (monastic life), Pashupata philosophy, a secular guide with methods of worship of Ganesha, Narasimha, Hayagriva, Rama, Krishna, Hanuman, Shiva, and Lakshmi. The text also glorifies goddess Radha as the mulaprakriti, one whose soul and love manifests all other Hindu goddesses.

The text's secular description and verse of praises are not limited to different traditions of Hinduism, but also other traditions. For example, chapter 1.2 extols Buddha. This contrasts with Kurma Purana which is disdainful of Buddhism without mentioning Buddha, but similar to the praise of Buddha in other major Puranas such as chapter 49 of the Agni Purana, chapter 2.5.16 of the Shiva Purana, chapter 54 of the Matsya Purana and various minor Puranas.

Chapters 92 through 109 of Purvabhaga are notable for summarizing the 18 major Puranas, one entire chapter dedicated to each. This has been an important benchmark in comparison studies, and as evidence that the Puranas were revised after the composition of Naradiya Purana, since the summary in these 18 chapters is significantly different from the extant manuscripts of the major Puranas. Other topics covered in the verses of Uttarabhaga include flora and fauna, food, music, dance, dress, jewellery, weapons, and theories on war.

The Naradiya Purana also contains Rukmangadacarita, a legend of king named Rukmangada, whose belief in Vishnu is repeatedly tested by an enchantress in the form of an apsara named Mohini, one that became subject of plays and dance arts in Indian culture. After Rukmangadacarita, the text predominantly is a compilation of geographic Mahatmyas or travel guides for pilgrimage along river Ganges starting with Haridwar, through Banaras (Kashi) towards Bengal, and nearby regions such as Gaya in Bihar and Nepal.

== See also ==
- Brahma Vaivarta Purana
- Brahma Purana
- Markandeya Purana
- Shiva Purana
- Vishnu Purana
