= Saura Purana =

Hindu religious text

The Saura Purana (Sanskrit: सौर पुराण, Saura Purāņa) is one of the Shaiva Upapuranas, a genre of Hindu religious texts. The printed editions of this text have 69 chapters (adhyāyas). The extant Saura Purana describes itself as a supplement (khila) to the Brahma Purana which consisting of two Samhitas with the first being dictated by Sanatkumara and the second by Surya to Vaivasvata Manu. It is presumed that an earlier version of this text different from the extant one existed but has since been lost.

== Date ==
The present Saura Purāṇa, which has been published by the Vaṅgavāsī Press, Calcutta, and the Ānandāśrama Press, Poona, is a work of the Pāśupatas, composed between A.D. 950 and 1050 somewhere about the north-western part of northern India.

== Content ==
The extant Saura Purana, though proclaimed by Surya, eulogises Shiva and his shakti Parvati. This text praises Varanasi and describes its various sacred places and lingas. It consists of a version of the narrative of Urvashi and Pururavas in chapter 31. It also deals with Devi worship, merits of dānas (donations), vratas (vows) and brief descriptions of the Puranas. Chapters 38-40 contain attacks on Madhvacharya, an early medieval philosopher and his works in the form of a prophecy.

== Printed editions ==
The early printed editions of this text published by the Anandashrama (Anandashrama Sanskrit Series 18), Pune in 1889 and the Vangavasi Press, Calcutta in 1908 (along with a Bengali translation) are practically identical.

== Bibliography ==
- Mohanty, Snigdha (2004). The Saurapurana: A Critical Study. University (Thesis). Utkal University. hdl:10603/129627 – via Shodhganga.
- Rocher, Ludo (1986). The Purāṇas. Wiesbaden: Otto Harrassowitz. ISBN 3-447-02522-0.
- Winternitz, Maurice (1981). A History of Indian Literature. Vol. 1. Delhi: Motilal Banarsidass. ISBN 81-208-0264-0.
