= Iconography of Krishna =

The iconography of Krishna encompasses the various visual and symbolic representations of Krishna found in Hindu art, literature, (Note: Krishna is mentioned in numerous Hindu texts, the most important being Mahabharata, Bhagavata Purana, Vishnu Purana, etc.) and ritual practice. Depictions of Krishna vary widely, ranging from a playful child and divine lover to a wise charioteer and supreme deity. These images have evolved over time across different regions and traditions.

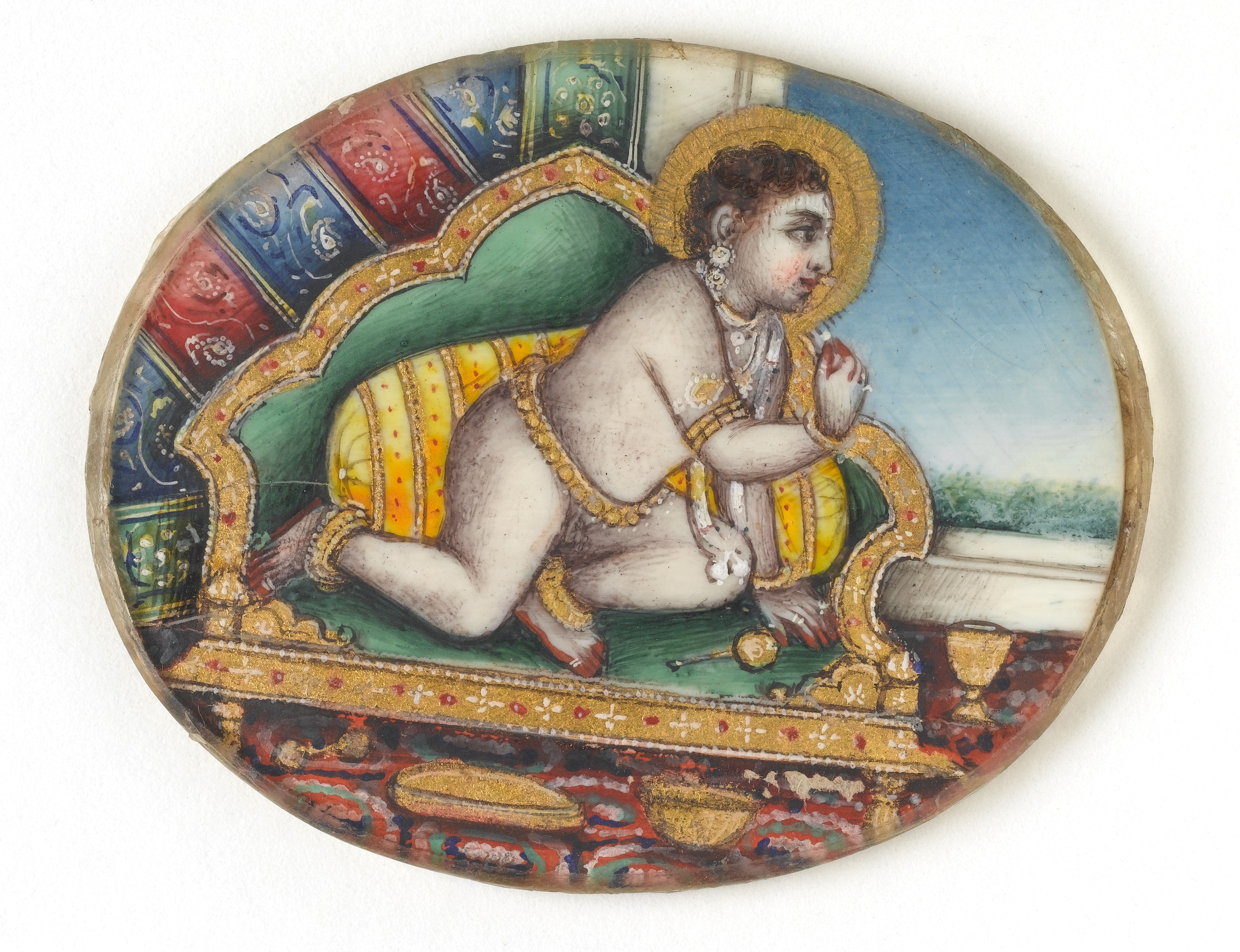
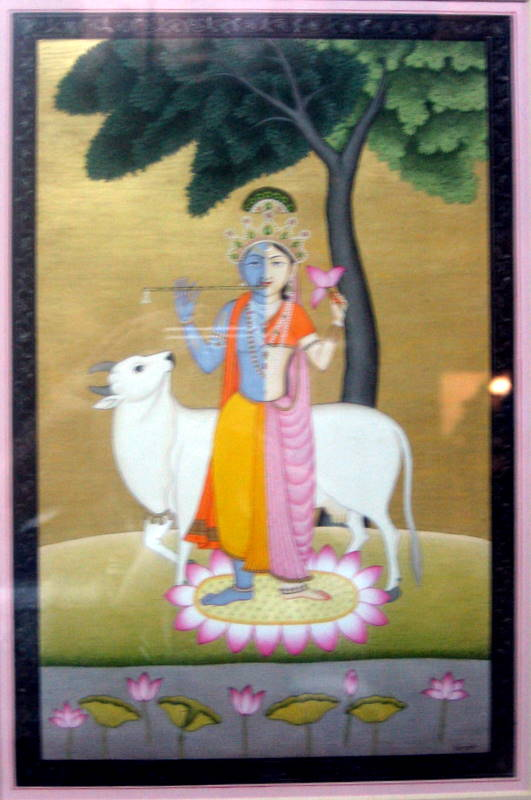
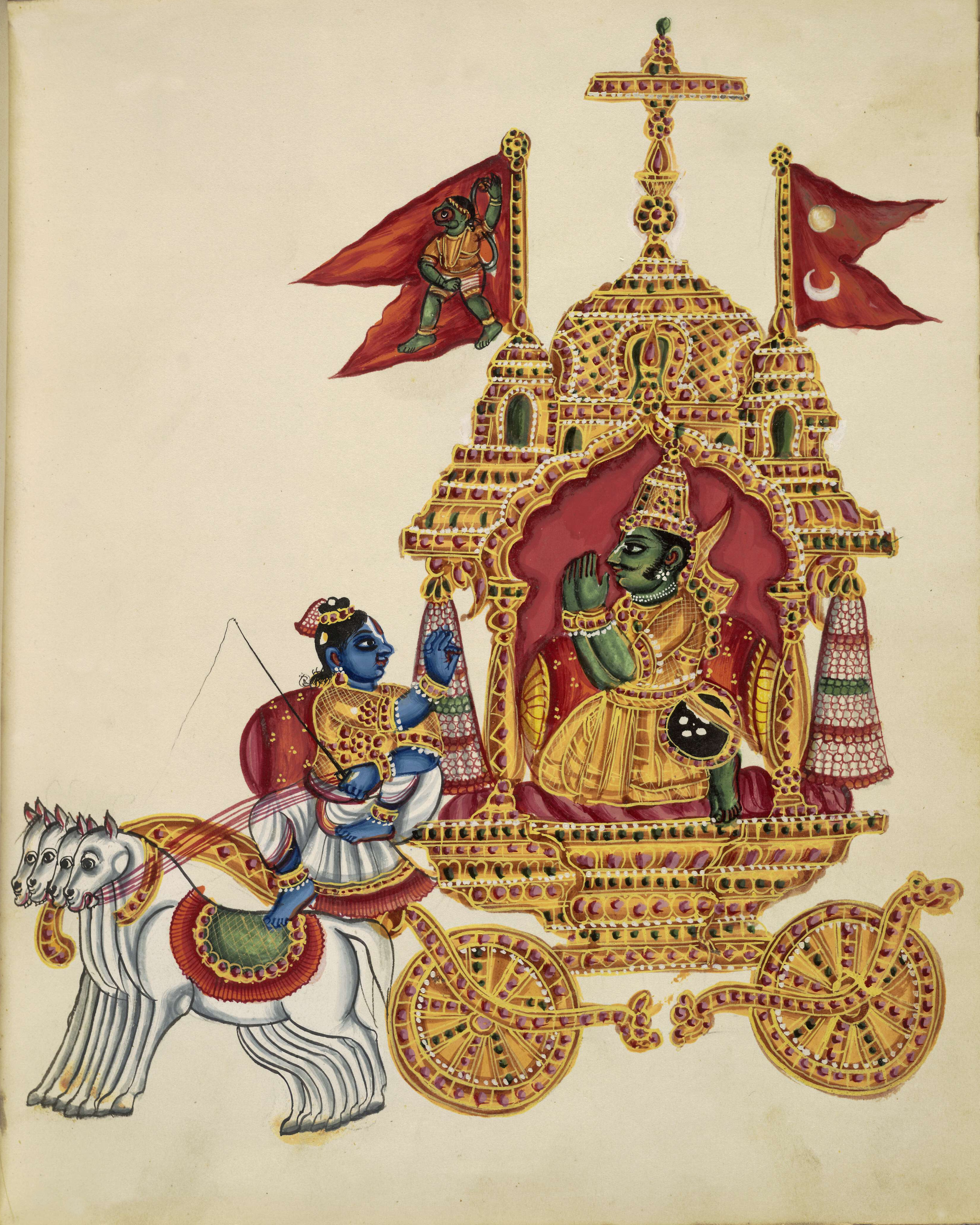
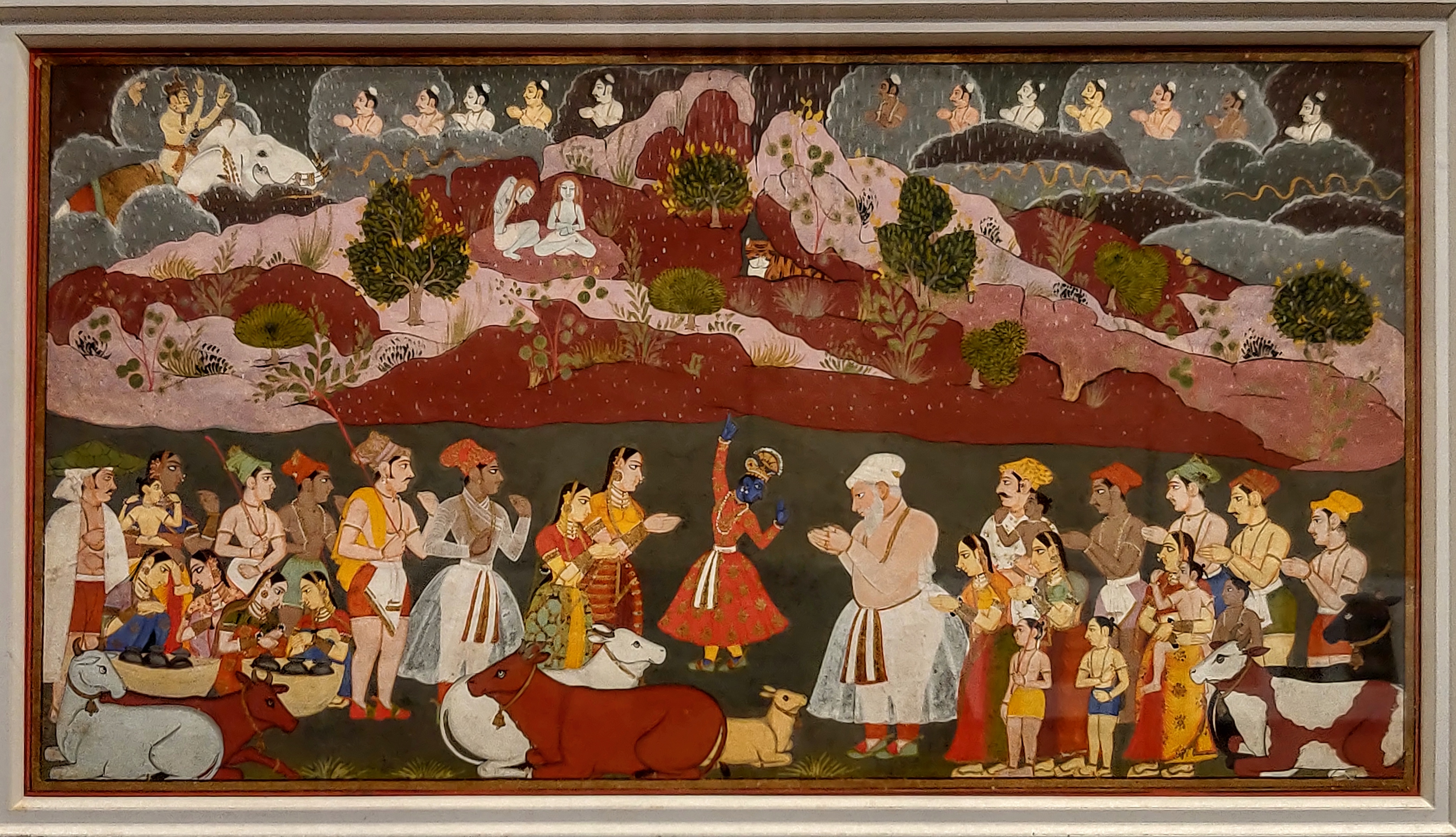
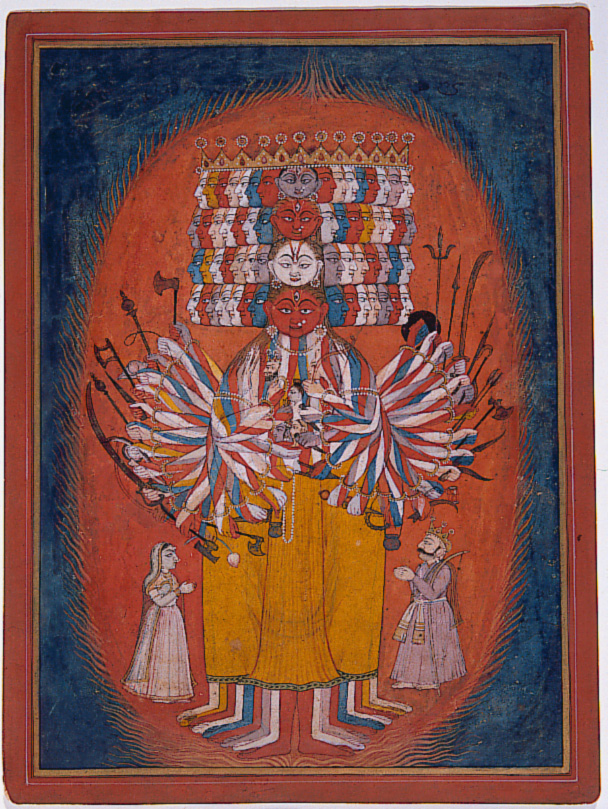
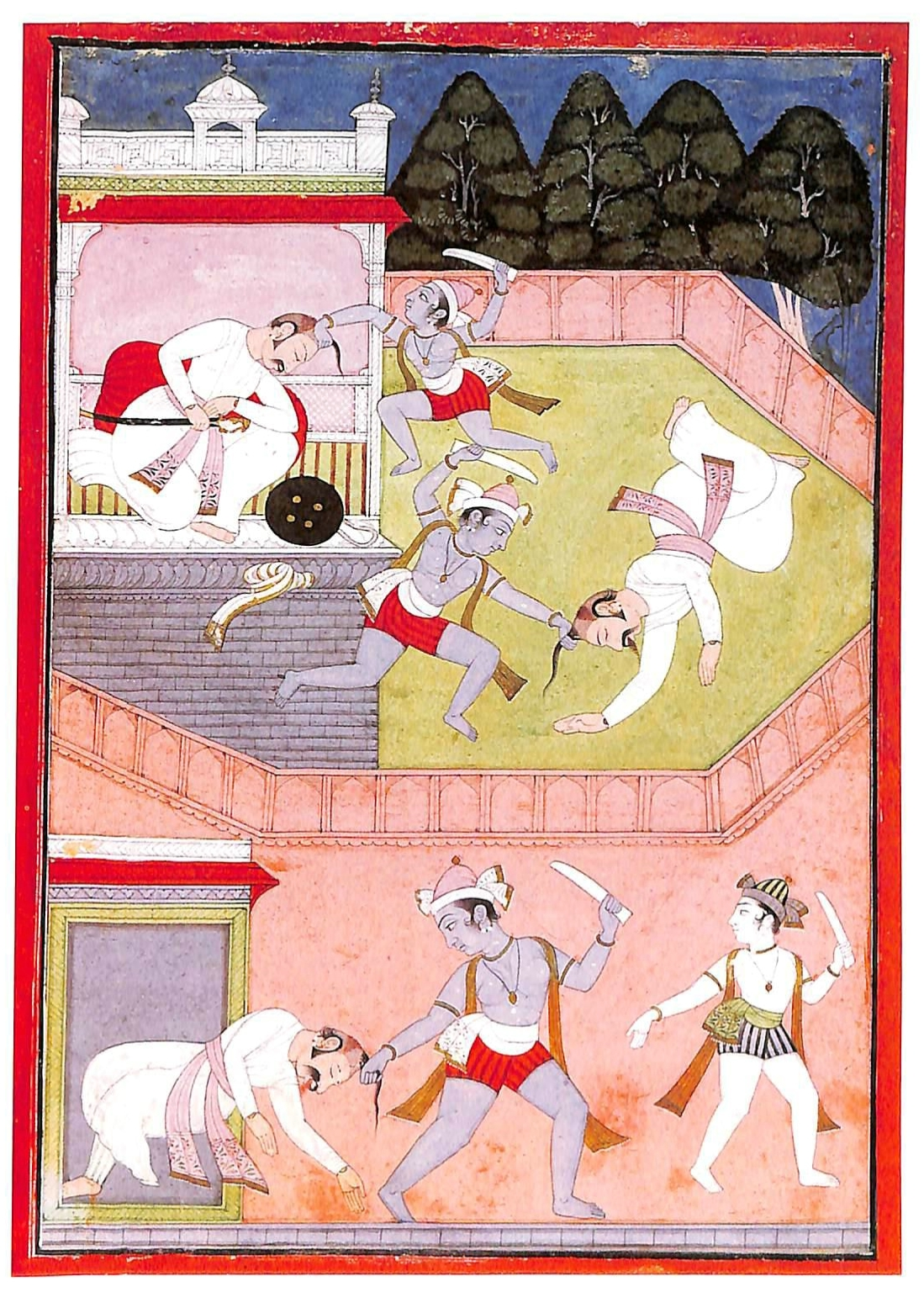
Different forms of Krishna (from left to right): Krishna as a child; Krishna as the divine lover of Radha; Krishna as the charioteer of Arjuna instructing Bhagavad Gita in Kurukshetra War; Krishna as a protector lifting Govardhan Hill; Vishvarupa of Krishna, the cosmic god; Krishna slaying his tyrant uncle Kamsa

The visual representations of Krishna exhibit a wide range of forms and styles. Images typically highlight different stages of his life, from depictions of Krishna as a child engaged in playful activities (Bala Krishna) to a youthful cowherd (Gopala), a lover of the gopis, a heroic figure in the Mahabharata, and a cosmic deity (Vishvarupa). These portrayals have been produced in sculpture, painting, architecture, and performance art, allowing the figure of Krishna to remain central in South Asian religious and cultural expression.

Krishna's iconography has also influenced broader cultural and social practices. His images have been incorporated into devotional rituals, temple festivals, (Note: There are several festivals associated with Krishna, such as Krishna Janmashtami, Gita Mahotsav, Govardhan Puja, etc.) and domestic worship, as well as into literary and theatrical traditions such as classical dance and folk performance. The widespread circulation of printed images in the modern period further expanded his visual presence, making Krishna recognizable not only as a religious figure but also as a cultural icon.

The visual representations of Krishna not only serve as objects of devotion but also as conveyors of philosophical and cultural ideas. Through recurring symbols, gestures, and narrative contexts, these depictions communicate aspects of divine play (lila), love, protection, and cosmic order.

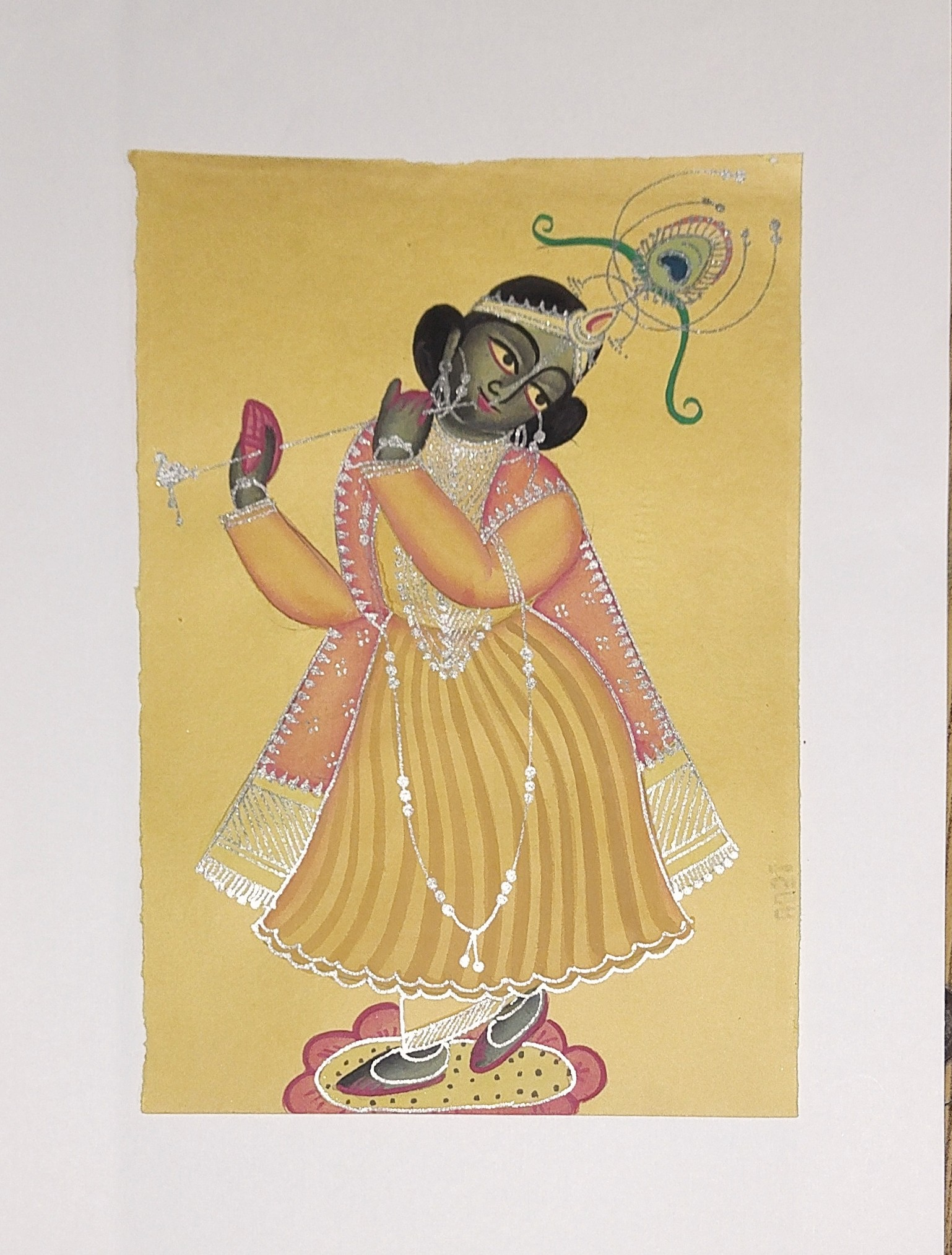
Krishna playing flute

== Features and motifs ==
Common iconographic features include Krishna's dark or blue-toned complexion, yellow garments (pitambar), peacock feather, and flute (murali). Surrounding motifs, such as cows, gopis, and pastoral landscapes, are frequently depicted to situate Krishna within specific narratives or symbolic contexts. While these elements are widely recognized, variations exist depending on the region, period, sect, and medium.

== Differences by region ==
South Indian bronze figures emphasize balance and dance-like posture, North Indian miniature paintings highlight pastoral and romantic themes, and Eastern traditions such as Jagannath focus on highly stylized forms.

== Architecture ==
Krishna iconography forms an important element in the figural sculpture on 17th–19th century terracotta temples of Bengal. In many temples, the stories of Krishna are depicted on a long series of narrow panels along the base of the facade. In other temples, the important Krishnalila episodes are depicted on large brick panels above the entrance arches or on the walls surrounding the entrance.

== Guidelines ==
Guidelines for the preparation of Krishna icons in design and architecture are described in medieval-era Sanskrit texts on Hindu temple arts such as Vaikhanasa agama, Vishnu dharmottara, Brihat samhita, and Agni Purana. Similarly, early medieval-era Tamil texts also contain guidelines for sculpting Krishna and Rukmini. Several statues made according to these guidelines are in the collections of the Government Museum, Chennai.

== Gallery ==
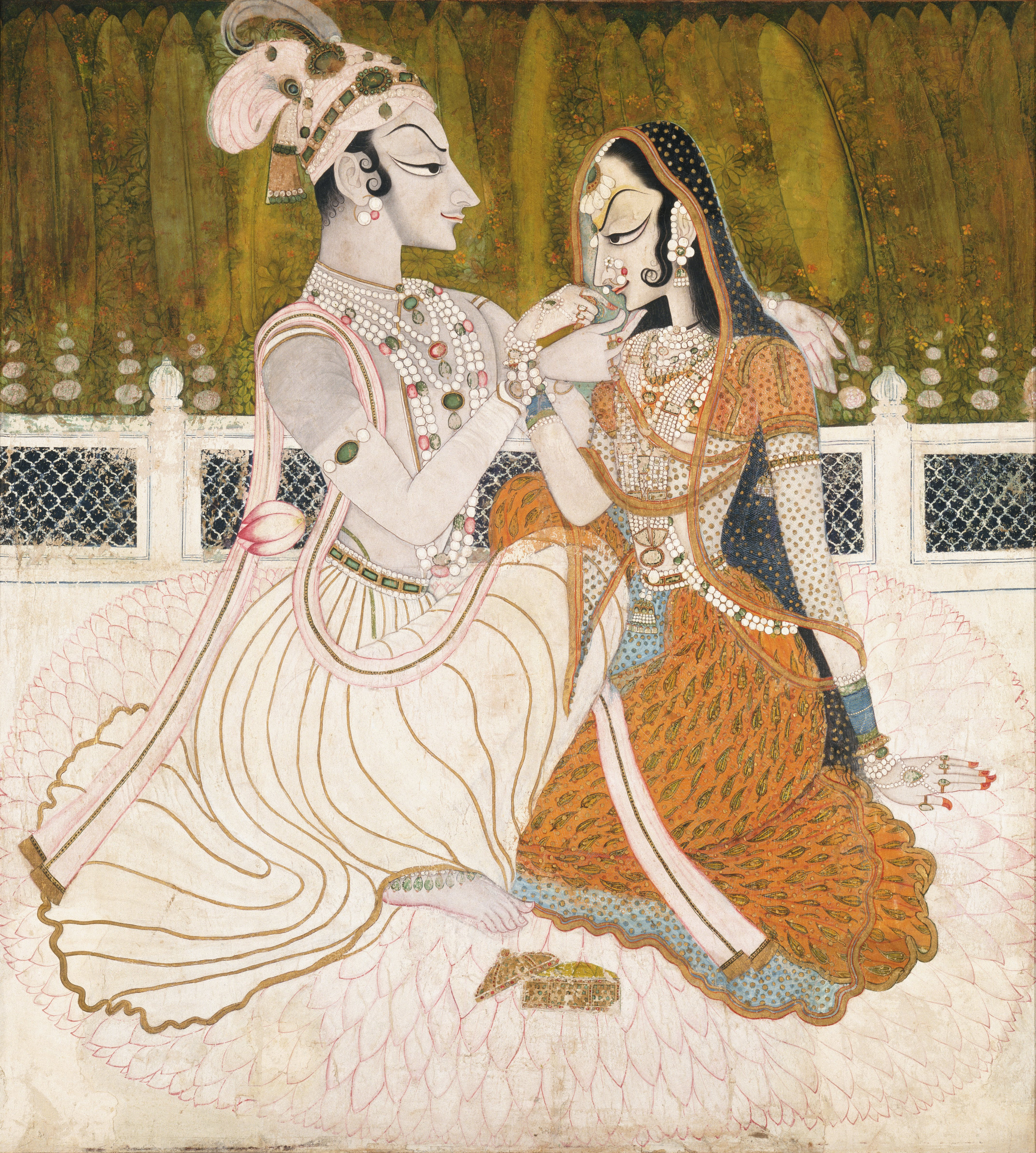
Krishna with Radha as a divine lover

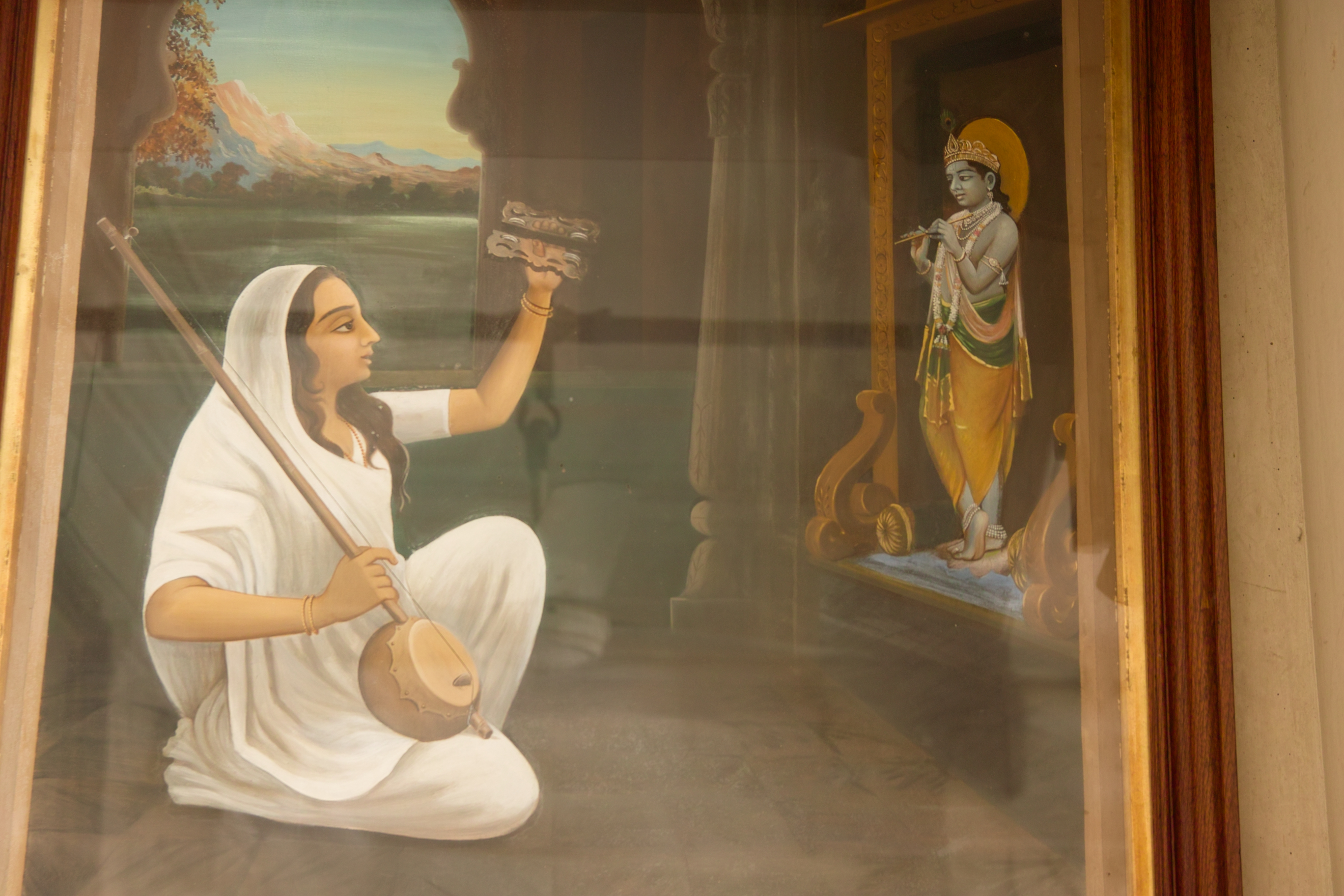
Krishna blessing Mirabai

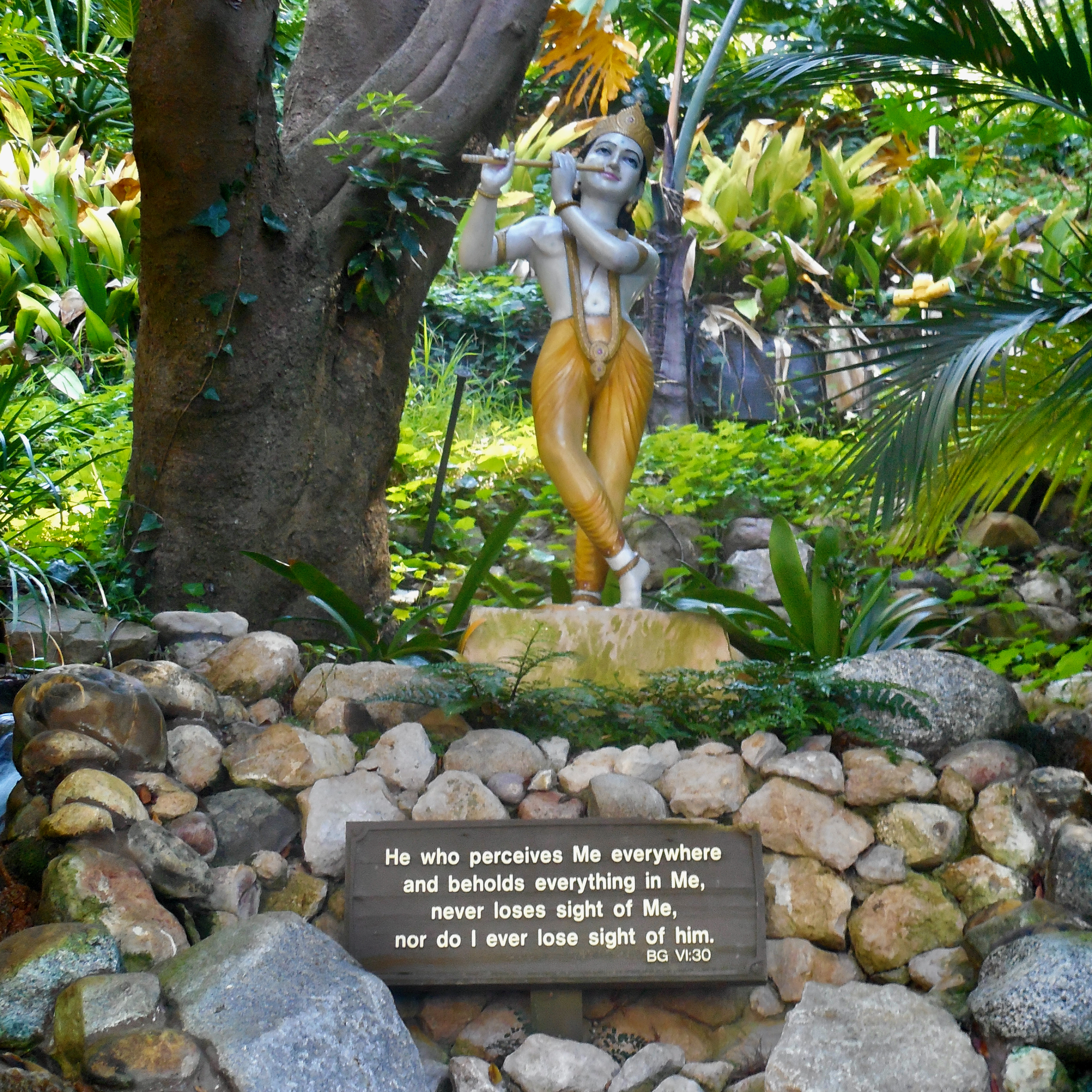
Krishna's idol

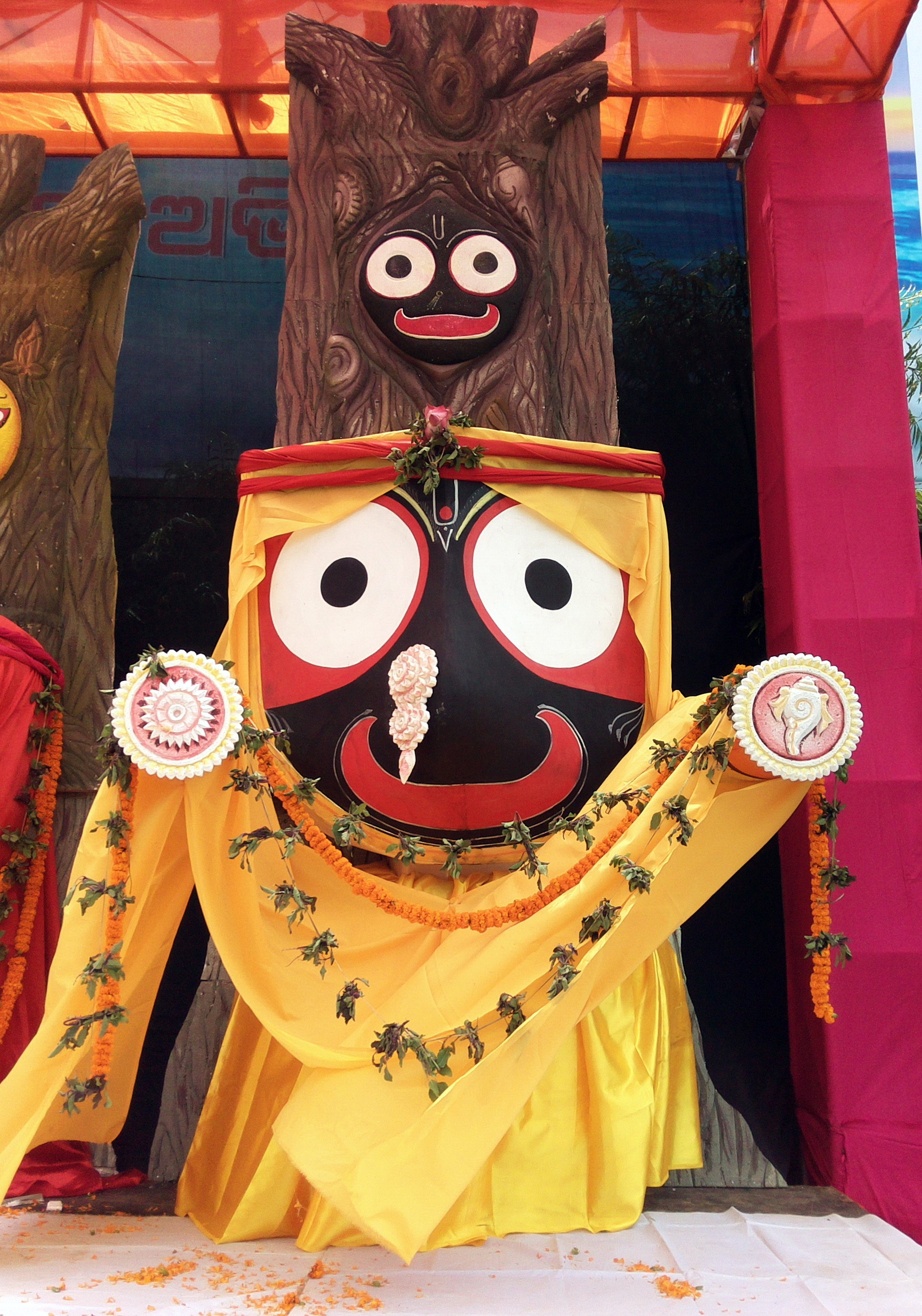
Krishna as Jagannath at Bhubaneswar

== See also ==
- Krishna in the Mahabharata
