= Narasimha Purana =

Minor Purana of Hinduism

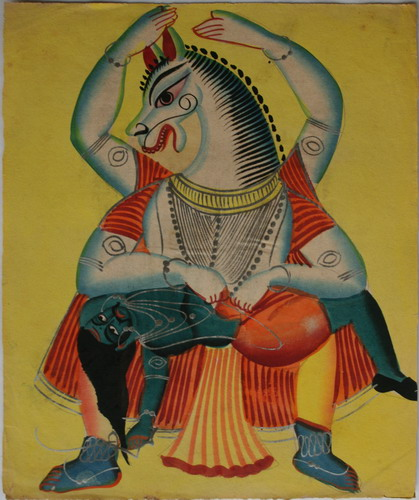
Kalighat Narasimha Avatar

Narasimha Purana (Sanskrit: नरसिंह पुराण; Narasiṁha Purāṇa) is one of the Upapuranas. R.C. Hazra in his Studies in the Upapuranas came to the conclusion that the original text was written in the later part of the 5th century CE, though several portions of it were added much later. This work was translated into Telugu about 1300 CE.

== Content ==
The recension presented by the printed editions of the text has 68 chapters. The 8th chapter of the text is one of the three versions of the Yama Gītā (other two versions are the Vishnu Purana, Book 3, ch.1–7 and the Agni Purana, Book 3, ch.381). The chapters 36–54 consist the narratives of the ten Avatars of Vishnu. Chapter 21 and 22 contain the short genealogical lists of the kings of the Surya Vamsha (Solar dynasty) and the Soma Vamsha (Lunar dynasty), the former ending with Buddha, son of Shuddhoana and the latter with Kshemaka, grandson of Udayana. Chapters 57–61 of this work is also found as an independent work, the Harita Samhita or Laghuharita Smriti.

== See also ==
- Markandeya
- Narasimha
- Puranas

== Bibliography ==
- Hazra, R.C. (1958). Studies in the Upapuranas. Calcutta Sanskrit College Research Series 2. Vol. 1. Calcutta: Sanskrit College.
- Hazra, R.C. (2003) [1962]. "The Upapuranas". In Radhakrishnan, S. (ed.). The Cultural Heritage of India. Vol. 2. Kolkata: The Ramakrishna Mission Institute of Culture. ISBN 81-85843-03-1.
