= Brihaddharma Purana =

The Brihaddharma Purana (Sanskrit: बृहद्धर्म पुराण, Bṛhaddharma Purāņa) is a Hindu religious text, which classified itself (I.25.26) as the last of the 18 Upapuranas. The extant text comprises three khaṇḍas (parts): pūrvakhaṇḍa, madhyakhaṇḍa and uttarakhaṇḍa. On the basis of its usage of Sanskrit words with unusual meaning and Sanskrit proverbs popular in Bengal, a number of modern scholars believe that this text was written in Bengal. According to R. C. Hazra, a modern scholar, this text was composed in the second half of the 13th century. He classified it as a non-sectarian Upapurana.

== Content ==
The pūrvakhaṇḍa and madhyakhaṇḍa of both the Asiatic Society and the Vangavasi edition have 30 chapters. While the uttarakhaṇḍa of the Asiatic Society edition comprises 14 chapters, the Vangavasi edition comprises 21 chapters and R. C. Hazra considers these additional 7 chapters (15-21) as the essential part of the text.

=== Pūrvakhaṇḍa ===
The pūrvakhaṇḍa begins at the Naimisha Forest, with Suta reporting to the sages assembled there about Vyasa's discourse to Jabali on dharma and its constituent parts: satya, daya, shanti and ahimsa. In answer to Jabali's next question, Vyasa advises him about the gurus (teachers) in general and particularly the gurus occupying the highest position, one's parents. He illustrated his views on one's duty to his parents with a narrative of hunter Tuladhara and his advice to brahmin Kritabodha. In chapters 5-30, Vyasa, in answer to another question of Jabali, describes the tirthas (sacred places), reporting it as a conversation between goddess Rudrani and her two associates, Jaya and Vijaya. The description starts with a song of praise to Ganga and it includes the origin and sanctity of tulasi (Ocimum tenuiflorum) plant and the bilva (Aegle marmelos) tree. It also comprises descriptions on kalatirthas (auspicious times), which include auspicious times for Devi worship and studying religious texts.

=== Madhyakhaṇḍa ===
The madhyakhaṇḍa begins with Jabali's request for further information about Ganga. Vyasa answers his question in the form of a conversation between sage Śuka and his disciple Jaimini. The first chapter describes the creation as the yoga (union) of Brahma and the prakriti of the three guṇas of Brahma, Vishnu and Shiva. The second chapter has a brief description of Daksha and his daughter Sati. It is followed by a detailed narrative of Daksha, Shiva and Sati from the chapter 3 onwards, which ends in selection of Kamarupa as his abode by Shiva after Sati's yoni fell there, when her body was cut to pieces by Vishnu. In chapter 11, Sati appears before Shiva, who was in a meeting with Brahma and Vishnu and predicts that she will reincarnate as Ganga and Uma. Chapters 12-28 deal with the narratives of Ganga from her birth as daughter of Himalaya and Mena. Chapter 14 describes Narayana's instruction of music to sage Narada as a related story. These narratives related to Ganga are briefly interrupted in chapter 23, which describes the birth of Uma as the second daughter of Himalaya and Mena. Chapter 29 describes Manus and manvantaras and the kings belonging to solar and lunar dynasties. The last chapter (chapter 30) narrates the story of birth of Ganesha and his acquiring the head of an elephant.

=== Uttarakhaṇḍa ===
The uttarakhaṇḍa starts with the discussion about dharma. A general discussion on dharma followed by the specific dharmas to be followed by the people belonging to four varnas during their various stages of life (ashramas). This discussion includes a passage supporting the practice of Sati which mentions that it is the obligation of a widow to follow her husband in death (Chapter 8, 8-10). The following chapters deal with a number of vratas, hymns to the Navagraha deities, the four yugas and the narrative of Vena which includes his creation of 36 mixed castes, whose members were later assigned specific trades by the Brahmins during the reign of Vena's son Prithu.

The chapters 15-21, which are only found in the Vangavasi edition describes the story of Krishna's birth and the role played by Devi in it. They also comprise a description of Kali Yuga. The text ends with a eulogy of the Purana, describing it as a Vaishnava, Shaiva and Shakta shastra (21.5).

== Editions and translations ==
The first printed edition of this text was published by The Asiatic Society, Calcutta (1888–97), as a part of their Bibliotheca Indica series. It was edited by Haraprasad Shastri. In 1894, the Vangavasi Press, Calcutta published another edition of this text along with a Bengali translation by Panchanan Tarkaratna, who edited it. In 1915, a free and abridged English translation by Syama Charan Banerji was published from Lucknow by the Indian Commercial Press as the first volume of its Rambles in Scripture Land series.

== Bibliography ==
- Hazra, R.C. (2003) [1962]. "The Upapuranas". In Radhakrishnan, S. (ed.). The Cultural Heritage of India. Vol. 2. Kolkata: The Ramakrishna Mission Institute of Culture. ISBN 81-85843-03-1.
- Rocher, Ludo (1986). The Purāṇas. Wiesbaden: O. Harrassowitz. ISBN 3-447-02522-0.
