= Kapila Purana =

Minor Purana of Hinduism

The Kapila Purana (Sanskrit: कपिल पुराण, Kapila Purāṇa) (c. 11th century) is a Hindu religious text. The text is considered one of the 18 Upapuranas.

== Content ==
It contains 21 chapters which mostly narrate glories about the puņyakṣetras (sacred places) of Utkala. It subsequently describes the greatness of Purusottama Kshetra, Viraja Kshetra, Maiterya Vana, and Ekamra Tirtha. Sage Kapila is the main narrator of this Purana. He describes to king Shalyajit regarding the glorified virtue of Utkala Kingdom, which he reports as a conversation between sage Bharadvaja and the sages performing tapas (austerities) in Pushkarakshetra. It describes the Shiva, Durga, Vishnu and Surya shrines in and around Orissa. The Jnana yoga is described in the final chapter of this Purana.

== Bibliography ==
- Rocher, Ludo (1986). The Purāṇas. Wiesbaden: O. Harrassowitz. ISBN 3-447-02522-0.
- Tripathi, Shrikrishnamani, ed. (1981). Kapilapuranam (Critical ed.). Varanasi: Chaukhamba Surbharati Prakashan.
