= Puranas =

Hindu scriptures

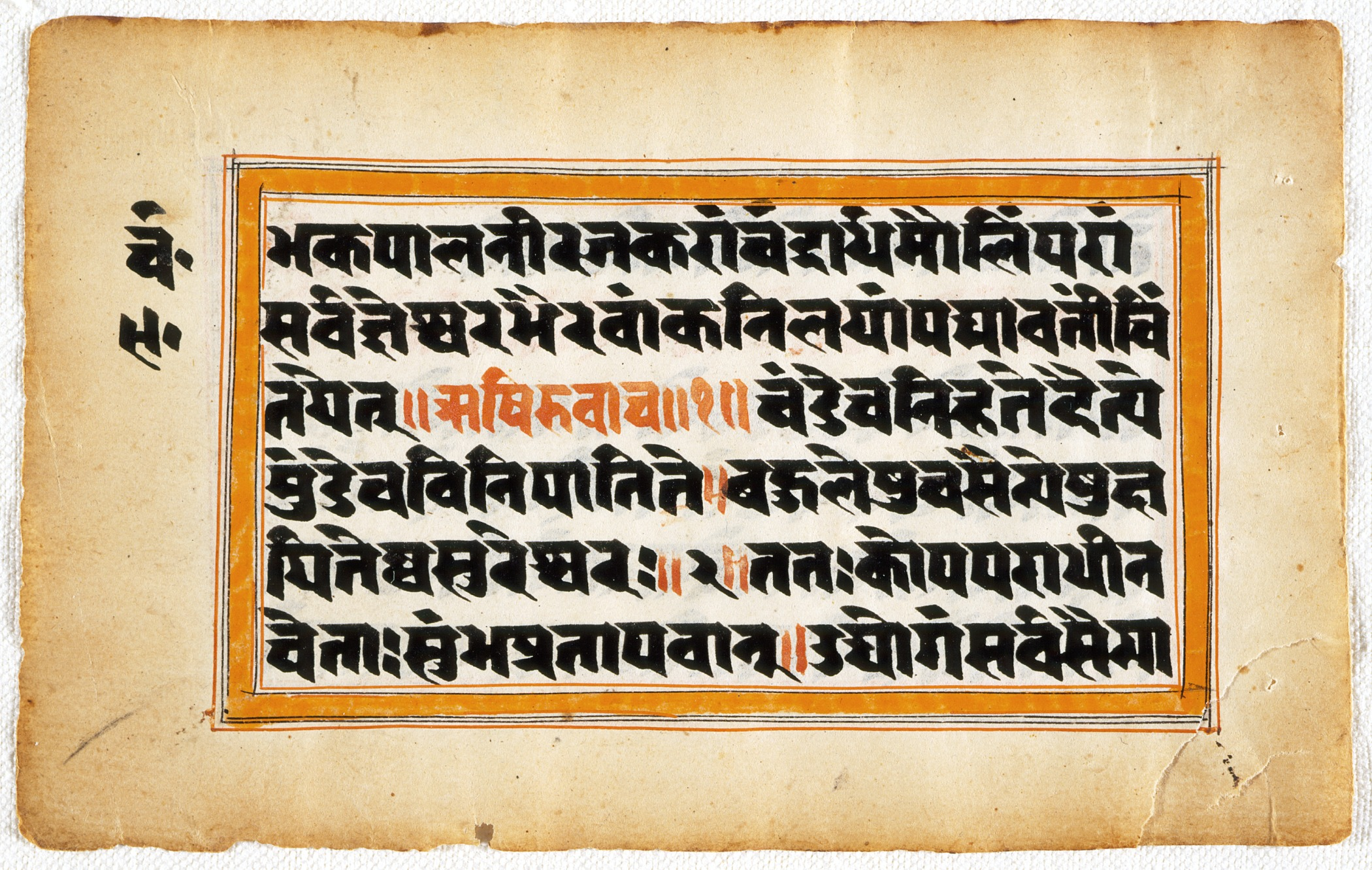
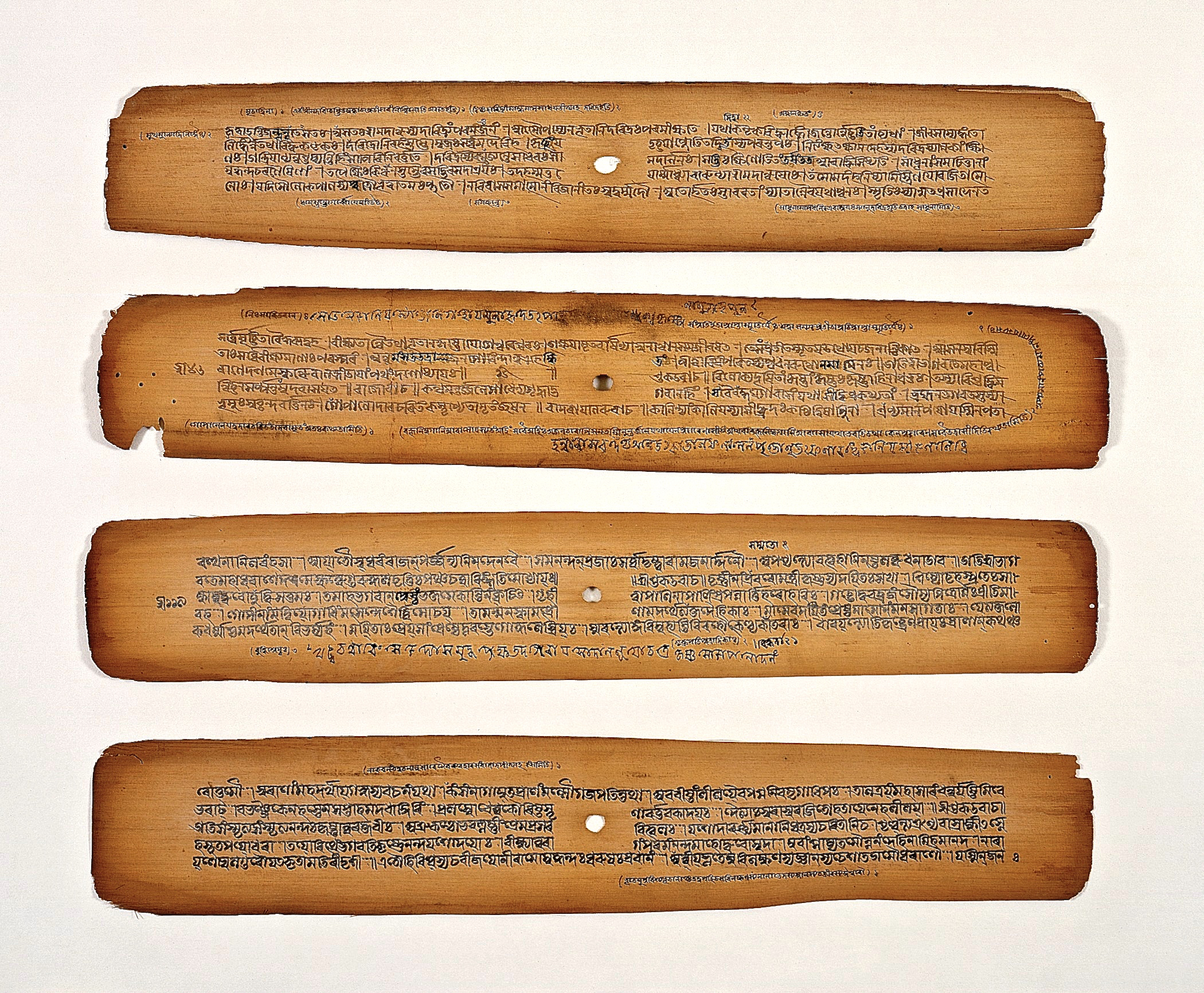
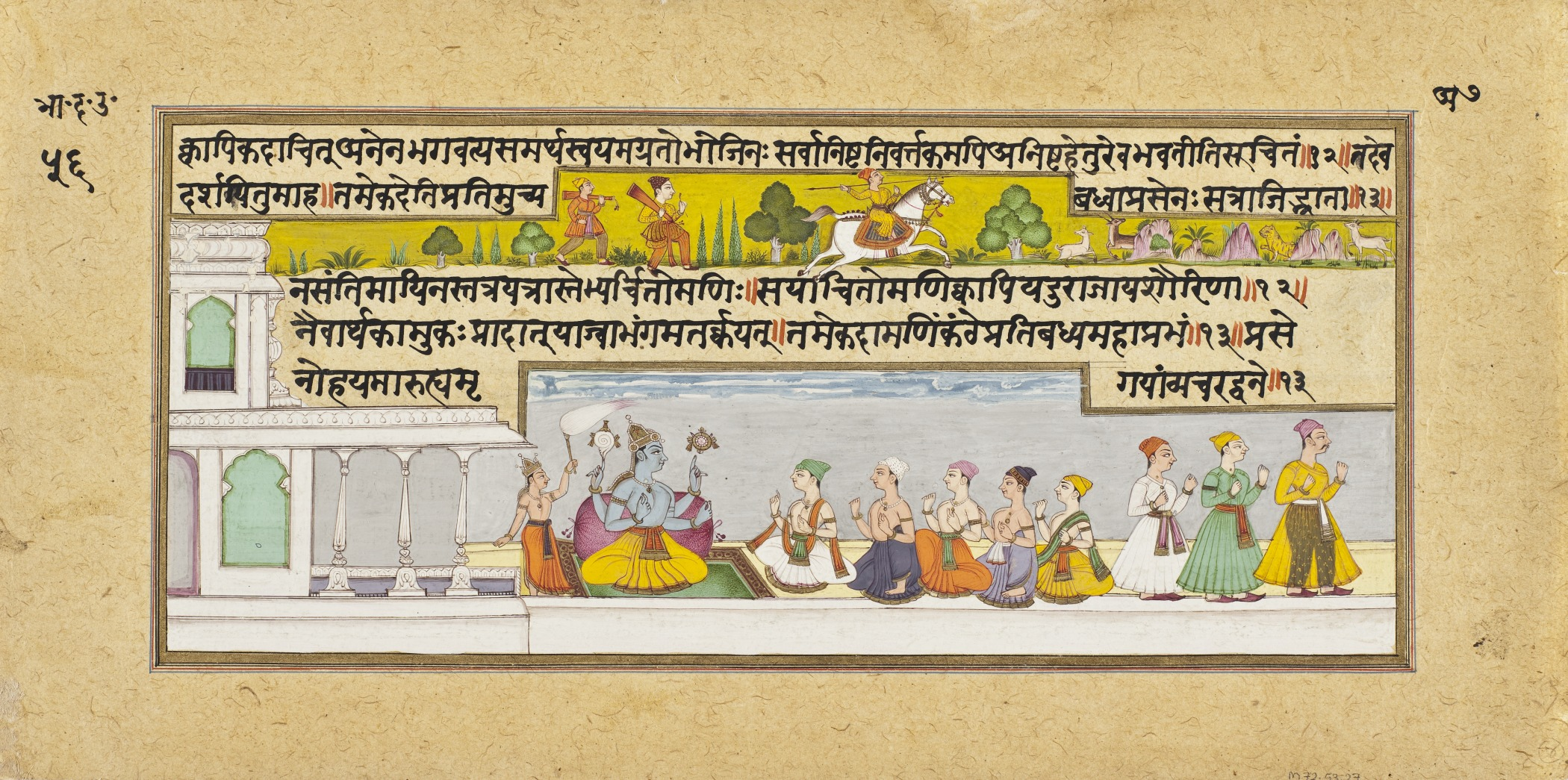
Purana manuscripts from 15th to 19th century CE

Puranas (Sanskrit: पुराण, romanized: Purāṇa, lit. 'Ancients') are a vast genre of Hindu Literature that include a wide range of topics, especially legends and other traditional lore. The Puranas are known for the intricate layers of symbolism depicted within their stories. Composed originally in Sanskrit and other Indian languages, several of these texts are named after major Hindu deities such as Devi, Vishnu, Shiva, and Brahma. The Puranic genre of literature is found in both Hinduism and Jainism.

The Puranic literature is encyclopedic, and it includes diverse topics such as cosmogony, cosmology, genealogies of gods, goddesses, kings, queens, heroes, heroines, sages, rituals, other gods, other goddesses, folktales, pilgrimages, temples, medicine, astronomy, grammar, mineralogy, humor, love stories, theology, and philosophy. The content is highly inconsistent across the Puranas, and each Purana has survived in numerous manuscripts which are themselves inconsistent. The Hindu Mahapuranas are traditionally attributed to Vyasa, but many scholars consider them likely to be the works of multiple authors over several centuries; in contrast, most Jaina Puranas can be dated and their authors assigned.

There are 18 Maha-puranas (Major Puranas) and 18 Upapuranas (Minor Puranas), with over 400,000 verses. The first versions of various Puranas were likely composed between 3rd and 10th centuries CE. While the Puranas do not have the authority of a scripture in Hinduism and are considered Smritis, they shaped Hinduism more than the Vedas, providing a "culture synthesis" by weaving together and integrating the diverse beliefs of a large number of local traditions into the Vedic-Brahmanic fold. The Puranas praise many gods and goddesses and the religious practices described in them are considered Vaidika (congruent with Vedic literature). The Puranic literature wove with the Bhakti movement in India, and both Dvaita and Advaita scholars have commented on the underlying Vedantic themes in the Maha Puranas.

== Etymology ==
Douglas Harper, creator of the Online Etymology Dictionary, states that the etymological origins of Puranas are from Sanskrit purāṇah, literally "ancient, former," from pura "formerly, before," cognate with Greek paros "before," pro "before," Avestan paro "before," Old English fore, from Proto-Indo-European *pre-, from *per-."

== Origin ==
Vyasa, the narrator of the Mahabharata, is hagiographically credited as the compiler of the Puranas. The ancient tradition suggests that originally there was only one Purana. Vishnu Purana (3.6.15) mentions that Vyasa entrusted his Puranasamhita to his disciple Lomaharshana, who in turn imparted it to his disciples, (Note: Six disciples: Sumati, Agnivarchaha, Mitrayu, Shamshapyana, Akritaverna and Savarni) three of whom compiled their own samhitas. These three, together with Lomaharshana's, composed the Mulasamhita, from which the later eighteen Puranas were derived.

The term purana appears in the Vedic texts. For example, the Atharva Veda mentions purana (in the singular) in XI.7.24 and XV.6.10-11:

"The Rig and Sama verses, the Chandas, the Purana along with the Yajur formulae, all sprang from the remainder of the sacrificial food, (as also) the gods that resort to heaven. He changed his place and went over to great direction, and Itihasa and Purana, gathas, verses in praise of heroes followed in going over."

— XV.6.10-11, Atharva Veda,

Similarly, the Shatapatha Brahmana (XI.5.6.8) mentions itihasapuranam (as one compound word) and recommends that on the 9th day of Pariplava, the hotr priest should narrate some Puranas because "the Purana is the Veda, this it is" (XIII.4.3.13). However, P. V. Kane states that it is not certain whether these texts refer to several works or a single work with the term purana. The late Vedic text Taittiriya Aranyaka (II.10) uses the term in the plural. Therefore, Kane states that in the later Vedic period at least, the Puranas referred to three or more texts, and that they were studied and recited. In numerous passages the Mahabharata mentions purana in both singular and plural forms. Moreover, it is not unlikely that, where the singular 'puranam' was employed in the texts, a class of works was meant. Despite the mention of the term purana or puranas in the Vedic texts, there is uncertainty about their content until the composition of the oldest Dharmashastras, Apastamba Dharmasutra and Gautama Dharmasutra, which mention Puranas that resemble the extant Puranas.

Another early mention of the term itihasapurana is found in the Chandogya Upanishad (7.1.2), translated by Patrick Olivelle as "the corpus of histories and ancient tales as the fifth Veda". (Note: The early Buddhist text (Sutta Nipata 3.7 describes the meeting between the Buddha and Sela. It has been translated by Mills and Sujato as, "(...) the brahmin Sela was visiting Āpaṇa. He was an expert in the three Vedas, with the etymologies, the rituals, the phonology and word analysis, and fifthly the legendary histories".) The Brhadaranyaka Upanishad also refers to the Purana as the "fifth Veda".

According to Thomas Coburn, Puranas and early extra-puranic texts attest to two traditions regarding their origin, one describes a divine origin as the breath of the great beings, while the other describes a human sage named Vyasa as the arranger of already existing material into eighteen Puranas. In early references, Coburn states, the term purana occurs in the singular, unlike the later era, when a plural form was used, presumably because texts had assumed their "multifarious form".

According to the Indologists J. A. B. van Buitenen and Cornelia Dimmitt, the Puranas that have survived into the modern era are ancient but represent "an amalgam of two somewhat different but never entirely different separate oral literatures: the Brahmin tradition stemming from the reciters of the Vedas, and the bardic poetry recited by Sutas that was handed down in Kshatriya circles". The original Puranas had priestly roots, while the later genealogies had warrior and epic roots. These texts were collected for the "second time between the fourth and sixth centuries CE under the rule of the Gupta kings and queens", a period of Hindu renaissance. However, the editing and expansion of the Puranas did not stop after the Gupta era, and the texts continued to "grow for another five hundred or a thousand years". These were preserved by priests who maintained Hindu pilgrimage sites and temples. The core of Itihasa-Puranas, states Klaus Klostermaier, may possibly go back to the 7th century BCE or even earlier.

== Dating ==
It is not possible to set a specific date for any Purana as a whole, states Ludo Rocher. He points out that even for the better established and more coherent Puranas such as the Bhagavata Purana and Vishnu Purana, the dates proposed by scholars continue to vary widely. Johnson notes that the date of the production of the written texts does not define the date of origin of the Puranas. They existed in an oral form before being written down. Wendy Doniger, based on her study of Indologists, assigns approximate dates to the various Puranas. She dates the Markandeya Purana to c. 250 CE (with one portion dated to c. 550 CE), the Matsya Purana to c. 250–500 CE, the Vayu Purana to c. 350 CE, the Harivamsa and the Vishnu Purana to c. 450 CE, the Brahmanda Purana to c. 350–950 CE, the Vamana Purana to c. 450–900 CE, the Kurma Purana to c. 550–850 CE, and the Linga Purana to c. 600–1000 CE.

== Texts ==
=== Mahapuranas ===
Of the many texts designated as 'Puranas' the most important are the Mahāpurāṇas or the 'major Puranas'. These are said to be eighteen in number, divided into three groups of six, though they are not always counted in the same way. The list of Mahapuranas is mentioned in the Vishnu Purana, part 3, chapter 6, verses 21–24. The number of verses in each Mahapurana is mentioned in the Bhagavata Purana, part 12, chapter 13, verses 4–9.

S.No.	Maha Purana	Verses number	Description
1	Brahma	10,000 verses	It is sometimes also called the Adi Purana, because many lists of Mahapuranas place it first among the eighteen. The text has 245 chapters, and shares many passages with the Vishnu, Vayu, and Markandeya Purana, and the Mahabharata. It includes mythology, theories of war, temple art work, and other cultural topics. It describes holy places in Odisha and incorporates themes relating to Vishnu and Shiva, though, despite the title, there is little mention of the deity Brahma.
2	Padma	55,000 verses	A large compilation of diverse topics, it describes cosmology, the world and nature of life from the perspective of Vishnu. It also discusses festivals, numerous legends, geography of rivers and regions from northwest India to Bengal to the kingdom of Tripura, major sages of India, various Avatars of Vishnu and his cooperation with Shiva, a story of Rama-Sita that is different from the Hindu epic Ramayana. The north Indian manuscripts of Padma Purana are very different from south Indian versions, and the various recensions in both groups in different languages (Devanagari and Bengali, for example) show major inconsistencies. Like the Skanda Purana, it is a detailed treatise on travel and pilgrimage centres in India.
3	Vishnu	23,000 verses	One of the most studied and circulated Puranas, it also contains genealogical details of various dynasties. It was better preserved after the 17th century, but exists in inconsistent versions before that. Ancient pre-15th century versions are very different from modern versions, with some versions discussing Buddhism and Jainism. Some chapters likely composed in Kashmir and Punjab region of South Asia. It is a Vaishnavism text, focused on Vishnu.
4	Shiva	24,000 verses	The Shiva Purana is one of eighteen Purana genre of Sanskrit texts in Hinduism, and part of the Shaivism literature corpus. It primarily centers around the Hindu god Shiva and goddess Parvati, but references and reveres all gods. The Shiva Purana asserts that it once consisted of 100,000 verses set out in twelve samhitas (books), however the Purana adds that it was abridged by sage Vyasa before being taught to Romaharshana.
5	Bhagavata	18,000 verses	The most studied and popular of the Puranas, it tells of Vishnu's Avatars, and of Vaishnavism. It contains genealogical details of various dynasties. Numerous inconsistent versions of this text and historical manuscripts exist, in many Indian languages. The text was influential in and was further elaborated during Bhakti movement.
6	Narada	25,000 verses	Also called Naradiya Purana. Discusses the four Vedas and the six Vedangas. Dedicates one chapter each, from Chapters 92 to 109, to summarize the other 17 Maha Puranas and itself. Lists major rivers of India and places of pilgrimage, and a short tour guide for each. Includes discussion of various philosophies, soteriology, planets, astronomy, myths and characteristics of major deities including Vishnu, Shiva, Devi, Krishna, Rama, Lakshmi and others.
7	Markandeya	9,000 verses	Describes Vindhya Range and western India. Probably composed in the valleys of Narmada and Tapti rivers, in Maharashtra and Gujarat. Named after sage Markandeya, a student of Brahma. Contains chapters on dharma and on Hindu epic Mahabharata. The Purana includes Devi Mahatmyam of Shaktism.
8	Agni	15,400 verses	Contains encyclopedic information. Includes geography of Mithila (Bihar and neighboring states), cultural history, politics, education system, iconography, taxation theories, organization of army, theories on proper causes for war, diplomacy, local laws, building public projects, water distribution methods, trees and plants, medicine, Vastu Shastra (architecture), gemology, grammar, metrics, poetry, food, rituals and numerous other topics.
9	Bhavishya	14,500 verses	The Bhavishya Purana (Bhaviṣya Purāṇa, lit. "Future Purana") is one of the eighteen major works in the Purana genre of Hinduism, written in Sanskrit.The title Bhavishya means "future" and implies it is a work that contains prophecies regarding the future, however, the "prophecy" parts of the extant manuscripts are a modern era addition and hence not an integral part of the Bhavishya Purana.Those sections of the surviving manuscripts that are dated to be older, are partly borrowed from other Indian texts such as Brihat Samhita and Shamba Purana.
10	Brahmavaivarta	18,000 verses	It is related by Savarni to Narada, and centres around the greatness of Krishna and Radha. In this, the story of Brahma-varaha is repeatedly told. Notable for asserting that Krishna is the supreme reality and the gods Vishnu, Shiva, Brahma are incarnations of him. Mentions geography and rivers such as Ganga to Kaveri.
11	Linga	11,000 verses	Discusses Lingam, symbol of Shiva, and origin of the universe as per Shaivism. It also contains many stories of Lingam, one of which entails how Agni Lingam solved a dispute between Vishnu and Brahma.
12	Varaha	24,000 verses	Primarily Vishnu-related worship manual, with large Mahatmya sections or travel guide to Mathura and Nepal. Presentation focuses on Varaha as incarnation of Narayana, but rarely uses the terms Krishna or Vasudeva. Many illustrations also involve Shiva and Durga.
13	Skanda	81,100 verses	Describes the birth of Skanda (or Karthikeya), son of Shiva. The longest Purana, it is an extraordinarily meticulous pilgrimage guide, containing geographical locations of pilgrimage centers in India, with related legends, parables, hymns and stories. Many untraced quotes are attributed to this text.
14	Vamana	10,000 verses	Describes North India, particularly Himalayan foothills region.
15	Kurma	17,000 verses	Contains a combination of Vishnu and Shiva related legends, mythology, Tirtha (pilgrimage) and theology
16	Matsya	14,000 verses	An encyclopedia of diverse topics. Narrates the story of Matsya, the first of ten major Avatars of Vishnu. Likely composed in west India, by people aware of geographical details of the Narmada river. Includes legends about Brahma and Saraswati. It also contains a controversial genealogical details of various dynasties.
17	Garuda	19,000 verses	An encyclopedia of diverse topics. Primarily about Vishnu, but praises all gods. Describes how Vishnu, Shiva and Brahma collaborate. Many chapters are a dialogue between Vishnu and the bird-vehicle Garuda. Describes cosmology and relationship between gods. Discusses ethics, crime, good versus evil, various schools of Hindu philosophy, the theory of Yoga, the theory of "heaven and hell" with "karma and rebirth", includes Upanishadic discussion of self-knowledge as a means to moksha. Includes chapters on rivers, geography of Bharat (India) and other nations of the world, types of minerals and stones, testing methods for stones for their quality, various diseases and their symptoms, various medicines, aphrodisiacs, prophylactics, Hindu calendar and its basis, astronomy, moon, planets, astrology, architecture, building home, essential features of a temple, rites of passage, virtues such as compassion, charity and gift making, economy, thrift, duties of a king, politics, state officials and their roles and their appointment, genre of literature, rules of grammar, and other topics. The final chapters discuss the practice of Yoga (Samkhya and Advaita types), personal development and the benefits of self-knowledge.
18	Brahmanda	12,000 verses	One of the earliest composed Puranas, it contains a controversial genealogical details of various dynasties. Includes Lalita Sahasranamam, law codes, system of governance, administration, diplomacy, trade, ethics. Old manuscripts of Brahmanda Purana have been found in the Hindu literature collections of Bali, Indonesia.

The Puranas, according to Flood, have traditionally been classified according to three qualities (guna) which are inherent in existence, namely the quality of light or purity (sattva), passion (rajas), and darkness or inertia (tamas). Each quality group comprises six puranas, focused primarily, but not exclusively, on a single deity.

Guna	Central deity	Maha Puranas
Sattva	Vishnu	Vishnu, Bhagavata, Garuda, Naradiya, Padma, and Varaha
Rajas	Brahma	Brahma, Brahmanda, Brahmavaivarta, Markandeya, Bhavisya, and Vamana
Tamas	Shiva	Shiva, Linga, Matsya, Kurma, Skanda, and Agni

The Puranas have also been classified based on a specific deity, although the texts are mixed and revere all gods and goddesses:

Deity	Puranas
Agni	Agni (Note: Like all Puranas, this text underwent extensive revisions and rewrite in its history; the extant manuscripts are predominantly an encyclopedia, and so secular in its discussions of gods and goddesses that scholars have classified as Smartism, Shaktism, Vaishnavism and Shaivism Purana.)
Brahma	Brahma, Padma
Shakti	Devi-Bhagavata, Markandeya, Brahmanda, Skanda
Shiva	Vayu, Skanda, Kurma, Linga, Vamana, Shiva, Matsya
Surya	Markandeya, (Note: This text includes the famous Devi-Mahatmya, one of the most important Goddess-related text of the Shaktism tradition in Hinduism.) Bhavishya, Brahma Vaivarta (Note: This text underwent a near complete rewrite in or after 15th/16th century CE, and almost all extant manuscripts are Vaishnava (Krishna) bhakti oriented.)
Vaishnava	Vishnu, Bhagavata, Naradiya, Garuda, Varaha, (Note: Hazra includes this in Vaishnava category.) Matsya, (Note: This text is named after a Vishnu avatar, but extant manuscripts praise all gods and goddesses equally with some versions focusing more on Shiva.) Vamana, Kurma, Brahmanda, Padma

Two puranas have "Bhagavata" in their names, the Bhagavata Purana and Devi Bhagavata Purana. According to Srivastava, both are called Mahapuranas in Sanskrit literature. The Vayu Purana, Matsya Purana, and Aditya Upa Purana admit the Devi Bhagavata Purana as a Mahapurana, whereas the Padma Purana, Garuda Purana and Kurma Purana consider it an Upapurana. There are discussions on whether the Devi Bhagavata Purana is a Mahapurana.

=== Upapurana ===
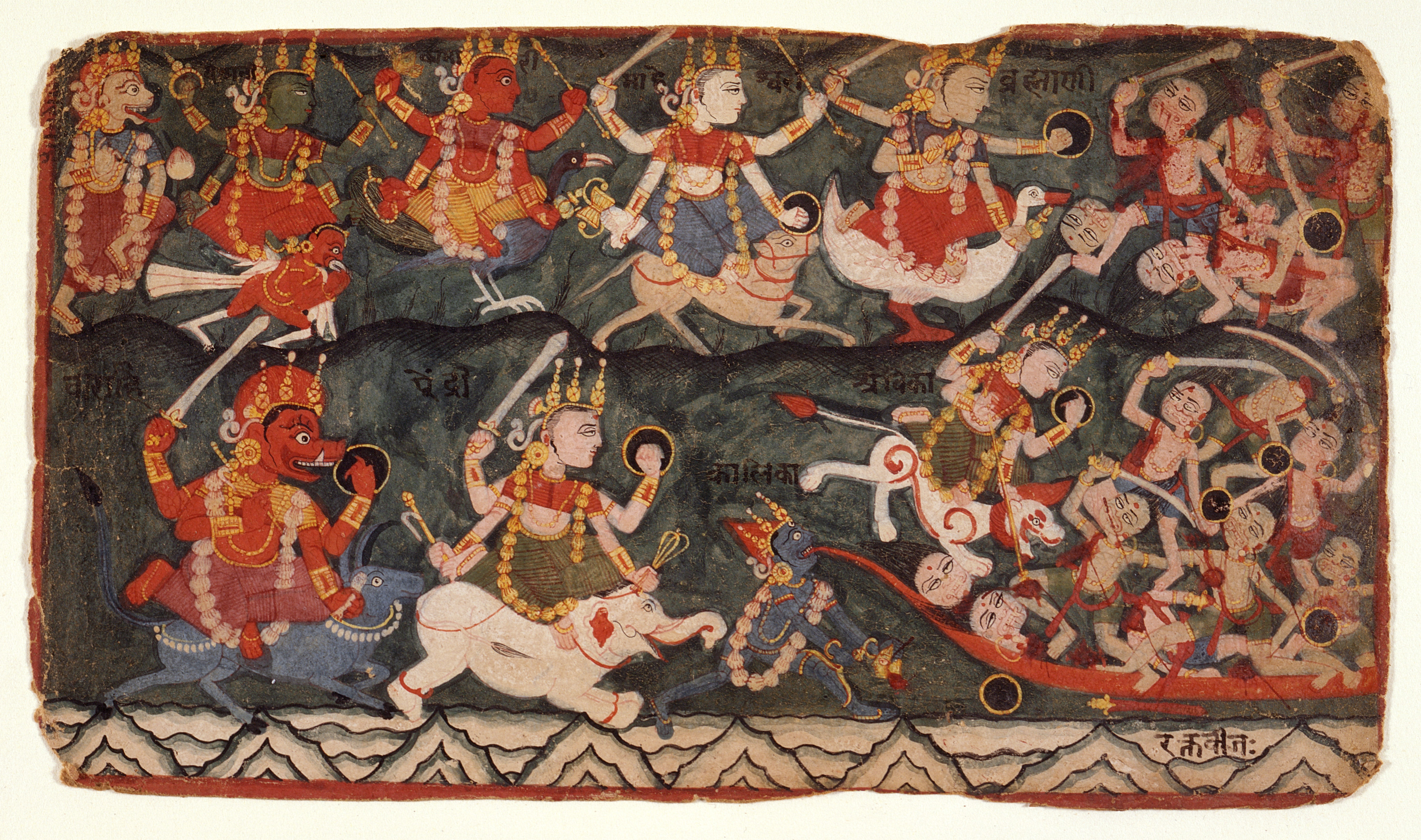
The Goddess Durga Leading the Eight Matrikas in Battle Against the Demon Raktabija, Folio from Devi Mahatmyam, Markandeya Purana.

The difference between Upapuranas and Mahapuranas has been explained by Rajendra Hazra: "a Mahapurana is well known, and that what is less well known becomes an Upapurana". Rocher states that the distinction between Mahapurana and Upapurana is ahistorical, noting that there is little corroborating evidence that either was more or less known, and that "the term Mahapurana occurs rarely in Purana literature, and is probably of late origin."

The Upapuranas are eighteen in number, with disagreement as to which canonical titles belong in that list of eighteen. Only a few have been critically edited.

They include:

1. Sanat-kumara
2. Narasimha
3. Brihad-naradiya
4. Shiva-rahasya
5. Durvasa
6. Kapila
7. Vamana
8. Bhargava
9. Varuna
10. Kalika
11. Samba
12. Nandi
13. Surya
14. Parasara
15. Vasishtha
16. Ganesha
17. Mudgala
18. Hamsa

The Ganesha and Mudgala Puranas are devoted to Ganesha.

=== Skanda Purana ===
The Skanda Purana is the largest Purana with 81,000 verses, named after the deity Skanda, the son of Shiva and Uma, and the brother of the deity Ganesha. The mythological part of the text weaves together the stories of Shiva and Vishnu, along with those featuring Parvati, Lakshmi, Rama, Krishna, Sita, Rukmini and other major gods and goddesses. In Chapter 1.8, it declares,

He who is Viṣṇu should be known as Śiva. He who is Śiva is Viṣṇu alone. The pedestal is the form of Viṣṇu and Maheśvara is in the form of Liṅga.

— Skanda Purana, 1.8.20-21

The Skanda Purana has received renewed scholarly interest since the late 20th century discovery of a Nepalese Skanda Purana manuscript dated from the early 9th century CE. This discovery established that the Skanda Purana existed by the 9th century CE. However, a comparison shows that the 9th century CE document is entirely different from the versions of the Skanda Purana that have been circulating in South Asia since the colonial era.

== Content ==
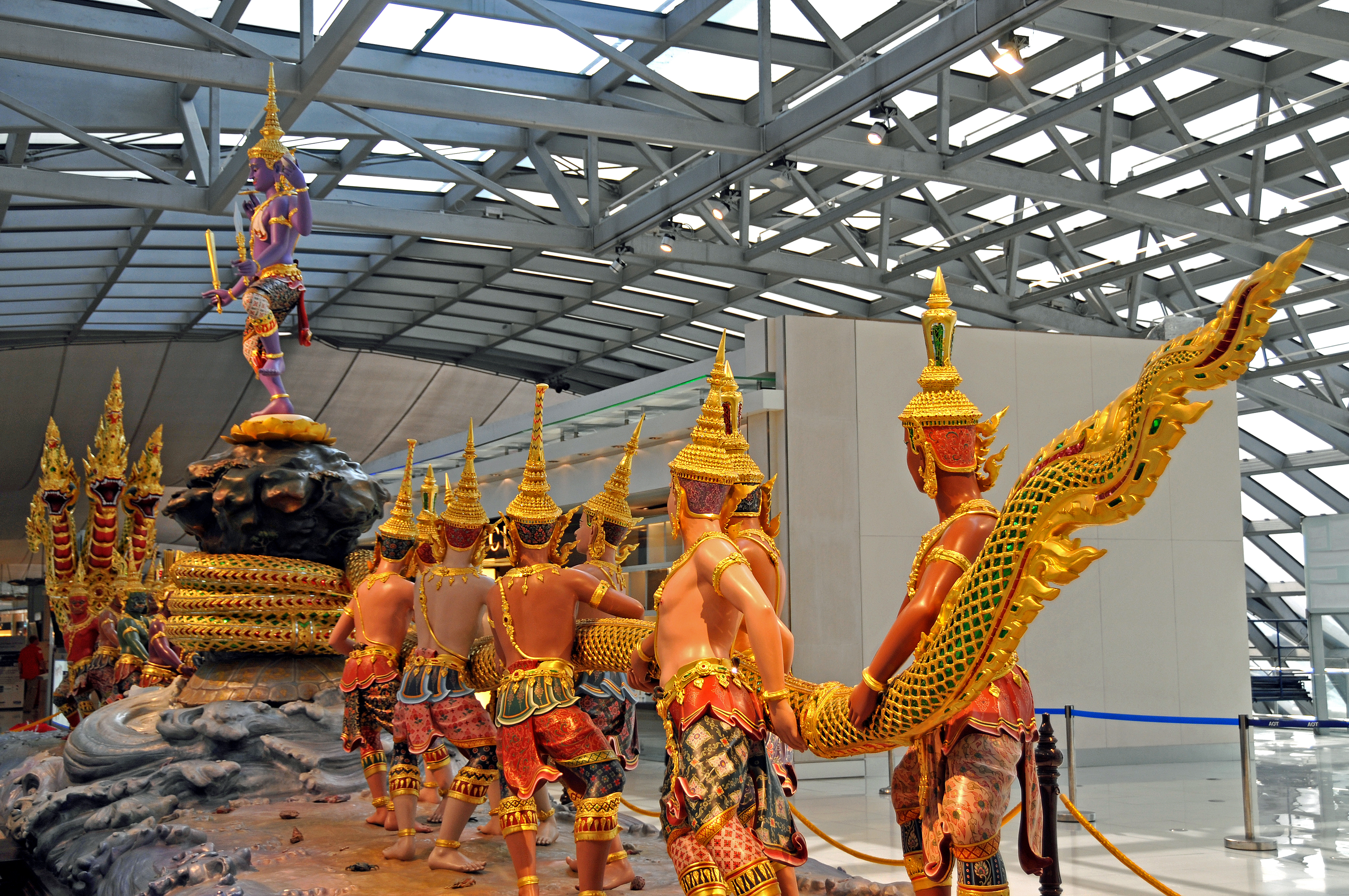
The Puranas include cosmos creation myths such as the Samudra Manthan (churning of the ocean). It is represented at Bangkok airport, Thailand.

Several Puranas, such as the Matsya Purana, list "five characteristics" or "five signs" of a Purana. These are called the Pancha Lakshana ( pañcalakṣaṇa), and are topics covered by a Purana:

1. Sarga: cosmogony or the creation of the world
2. Pratisarga: cosmogony and cosmology
3. Vamśa: genealogy of the gods, sages and kings and queens
4. Manvañtara: cosmic cycles, the history of the world during the time of one patriarch and matriarch
5. Vamśānucaritam: Accounts of royal dynasties, including the Suryavamshi and Chandravamshi kings and queens

A few Puranas, such as the most popular Bhagavata Purana, add five more characteristics to expand this list to ten:

1. Utaya: karmic links between the deities, sages, kings and the various living beings
2. Ishanukatha: tales about a god
3. Nirodha: finale, cessation
4. Mukti: moksha, spiritual liberation
5. Ashraya: refuge

These five or ten sections weave in biographies, myths, geography, medicine, astronomy, Hindu temples, pilgrimage to distant real places, rites of passage, charity, ethics, duties, rights, dharma, divine intervention in cosmic and human affairs, love stories, festivals, theosophy and philosophy. The Puranas link gods to men, both generally and in a religious, bhakti (devotional) context. Here the Puranic literature follows a general pattern. It starts with an introduction, where a future devotee is described as ignorant about the deity, yet curious. The devotee learns about the deity, and this begins their spiritual realization. The text then describes instances of this deity's grace, which inspires and deepens the devotee's devotion towards the deity. The devotee, then, shows devotion, which is rewarded by the deity. The reward is appreciated by the devotee, who, in return, performs further actions to express further devotion.

The Puranas, states Flood, document the rise of the theistic traditions such as those based on Vishnu, Shiva, Brahma, Tridevi and include respective mythology, pilgrimage to holy places, rituals and genealogies. The bulk of these texts, in Flood's view, were established by 500 CE, in the Gupta era, though amendments were made later. Along with inconsistencies, common ideas are found throughout the corpus, but it is not possible to trace the lines of influence of one Purana upon another, so the corpus is best viewed as a synchronous whole. An example of similar stories woven across the Puranas, but in different versions, include the Lingodbhava – the apparition of the Linga. This is a Shaiva story that features Brahma, Vishnu, Shiva, the Trimurti, who get together and debate about who is supreme amongst the three of them and after various incidents of the story, the glory of Shiva is established at the end by the apparition of the Linga which is a form of Shiva as Lingodbhava over Vishnu and Brahma, thus it shows that Vishnu and Brahma are secondary gods in the Trideva because He expanded and conquered the entire universe and them being secondary gods with lesser powers, so they cannot find his beginning and end at a single place in the universe. This story, state Bonnefoy and Doniger, appears in Vayu Purana's chapter 1.55, Brahmanda Purana's chapter 1.26, Shiva Purana's Rudra Samhita's Sristi Khanda's chapter 15, Skanda Purana's chapters 1.3, 1.16, 3.1, and other Puranas.

The texts are in Sanskrit as well as regional languages, and almost entirely in narrative metric couplets.

=== Symbolism and layers of meaning ===
The texts use ideas, concepts and even names that are symbolic. The words can interpreted literally, and at an axiological level. The Vishnu Purana, for example, recites a myth where the names of the characters are loaded with symbolism and axiological significance. The myth is as follows,

The progeny of Dharma by the daughters of Daksha were as follows: by Sraddhá (devotion) he had Kama (desire); by Lakshmí (wealth, prosperity), was born Darpa (pride); by Dhriti (courage), the progeny was Niyama (precept); by Tusht́i (inner comfort), Santosha (contentment); by Pusht́i (opulence), the progeny was Lobha (cupidity, greed); by Medhá (wisdom, experience), Sruta (sacred tradition); by Kriyá (hard work, labour), the progeny were Dańd́a, Naya, and Vinaya (justice, politics, and education); by Buddhi (intellect), Bodha (understanding); by Lajjá (shame, humility), Vinaya (good behaviour); by Vapu (body, strength), Vyavasaya (perseverance). Shanti (peace) gave birth to Kshama (forgiveness); Siddhi (excellence) to Sukha (enjoyment); and Kírtti (glorious speech) gave birth to Yasha (reputation). These were the sons of Dharma; one of whom, Kama (love, emotional fulfillment) had baby Hersha (joy) by his wife Nandi (delight).

The wife of Adharma (vice, wrong, evil) was Hinsá (violence), on whom he begot a son Anrita (falsehood), and a daughter Nikriti (immorality): they intermarried, and had two sons, Bhaya (fear) and Naraka (hell); and twins to them, two daughters, Máyá (deceit) and Vedaná (torture), who became their wives. The son of Bhaya (fear) and Máyá (deceit) was the destroyer of living creatures, or Mrityu (death); and Dukha (pain) was the offspring of Naraka (hell) and Vedaná (torture). The children of Mrityu were Vyádhi (disease), Jará (decay), Soka (sorrow), Trishńa (greediness), and Krodha (wrath). These are all called the inflictors of misery, and are characterised as the progeny of Vice (Adharma). They are all without wives, without posterity, without the faculty to procreate; they perpetually operate as causes of the destruction of this world. On the contrary, Daksha and the other Rishis, the elders of mankind, tend perpetually to influence its renovation: whilst the Manus and their sons, the heroes endowed with mighty power, and treading in the path of truth, as constantly contribute to its preservation.

— Vishnu Purana, Chapter 7, Translated by Horace Hayman Wilson

=== Puranas as a complement to the Vedas ===
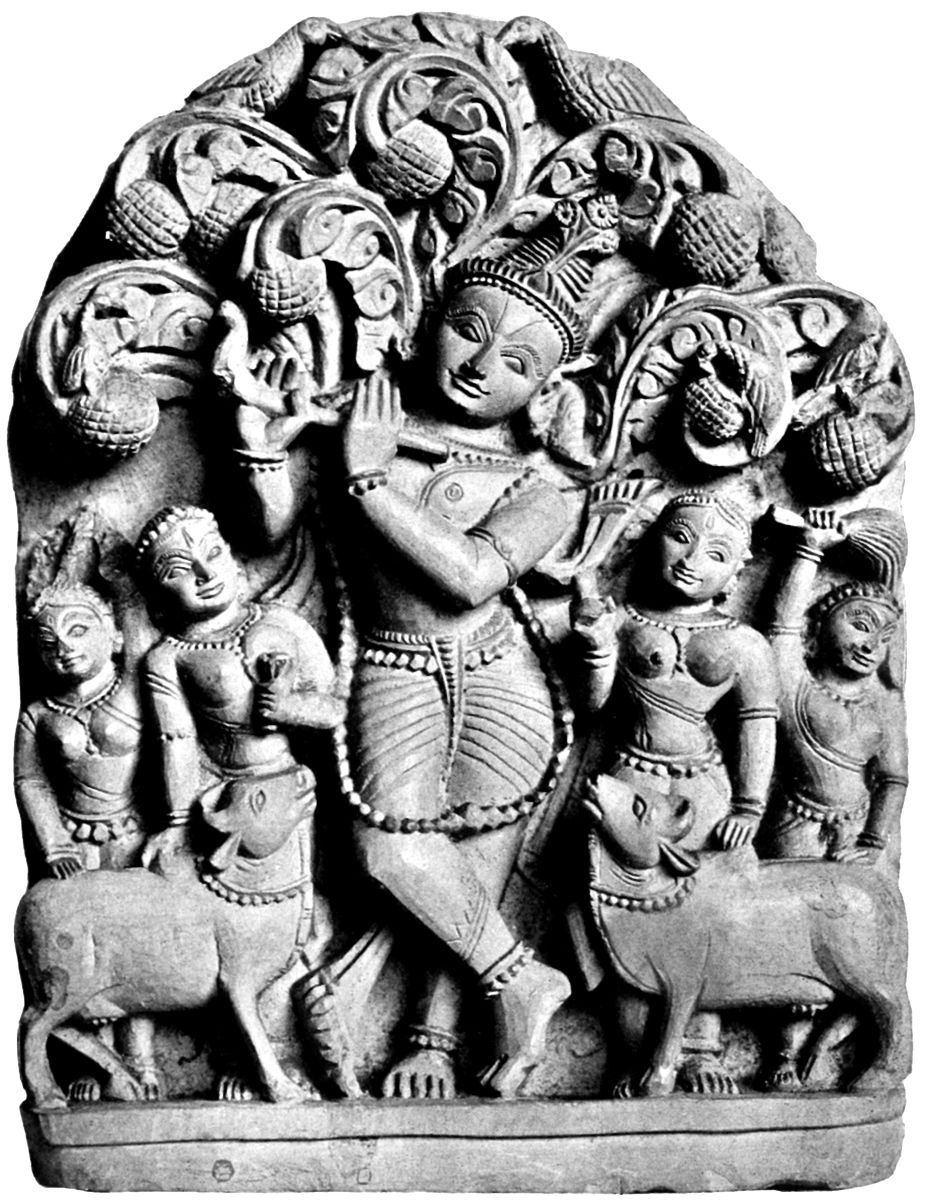
The mythology in the Puranas has inspired many reliefs and sculptures found in Hindu temples. The legend behind the Krishna and Gopis relief above is described in the Bhagavata Purana.

The relation of the Puranas with Vedas has been debated by scholars, some holding that there's no relationship, others contending that they are identical. The Puranic literature, stated Max Muller, is independent, has changed often over its history, and has little relation to the Vedic age or the Vedic literature. In contrast, Purana literature is evidently intended to serve as a complement to the Vedas, states Vans Kennedy. According to Ludo Roche (1984), the general consensus among Indologists is that the Puranas cannot be separated from the Vedas.

Some scholars such as Govinda Das suggest that the Puranas claim a link to the Vedas but in name only, not in substance. The link is purely a mechanical one. Scholars such as Viman Chandra Bhattacharya and PV Kane state that the Puranas are a continuation and development of the Vedas. Sudhakar Malaviya and VG Rahurkar state the connection is closer in that the Puranas are companion texts to help understand and interpret the Vedas. K.S. Ramaswami Sastri and Manilal N. Dvivedi reflect the third view which states that Puranas enable us to know the "true import of the ethos, philosophy, and religion of the Vedas".

Barbara Holdrege notes that the Itihasas (the Hindu epics) and Puranas claim the status of being a fifth Veda. (Note: There are only four Vedas in Hinduism. Several texts have been claimed to have the status of the Fifth Veda in the Hindu tradition. For example, the Natya Shastra, a Sanskrit text on the performing arts, is sometimes given this status.) The Puranas, states V.S. Agrawala, intend to "explicate, interpret, adapt" the metaphysical truths in the Vedas. In the general opinion, states Rocher, "the Puranas cannot be divorced from the Vedas" though scholars provide different interpretations of the link between the two. Scholars have given the Bhagavata Purana as an example of the links and continuity of the Vedic content, such as its providing an interpretation of the Gayatri mantra.

=== Puranas as encyclopedias ===
The Puranas, states Kees Bolle, are best seen as "vast, often encyclopedic" works from ancient and medieval India. Some of them, such as the Agni Purana and Matsya Purana, cover all sorts of subjects, dealing with – states Rocher – "anything and everything", from fiction to facts, from practical recipes to abstract philosophy, from geographic Mahatmyas (travel guides) to cosmetics, from festivals to astronomy. Like encyclopedias, they were updated to remain current with their times, by a process called Upabrimhana. However, some of the 36 major and minor Puranas are more focused handbooks, such as the Skanda Purana, Padma Purana and Bhavishya Purana, which deal primarily with Tirtha Mahatmyas (pilgrimage travel guides) while Vayu Purana and Brahmanda Purana focus more on history, mythology and legends.

=== Puranas as religious texts ===
The colonial-era scholars of Puranas studied them primarily as religious texts, with Vans Kennedy declaring in 1837 that any other use of these documents would be disappointing. John Zephaniah Holwell, who from 1732 onwards spent 30 years in India and was elected Fellow of the Royal Society in 1767, described the Puranas as "18 books of divine words". British officials and researchers such as Holwell, states Urs App, were orientalist scholars who introduced a distorted picture of Indian literature and Puranas as "sacred scriptures of India"

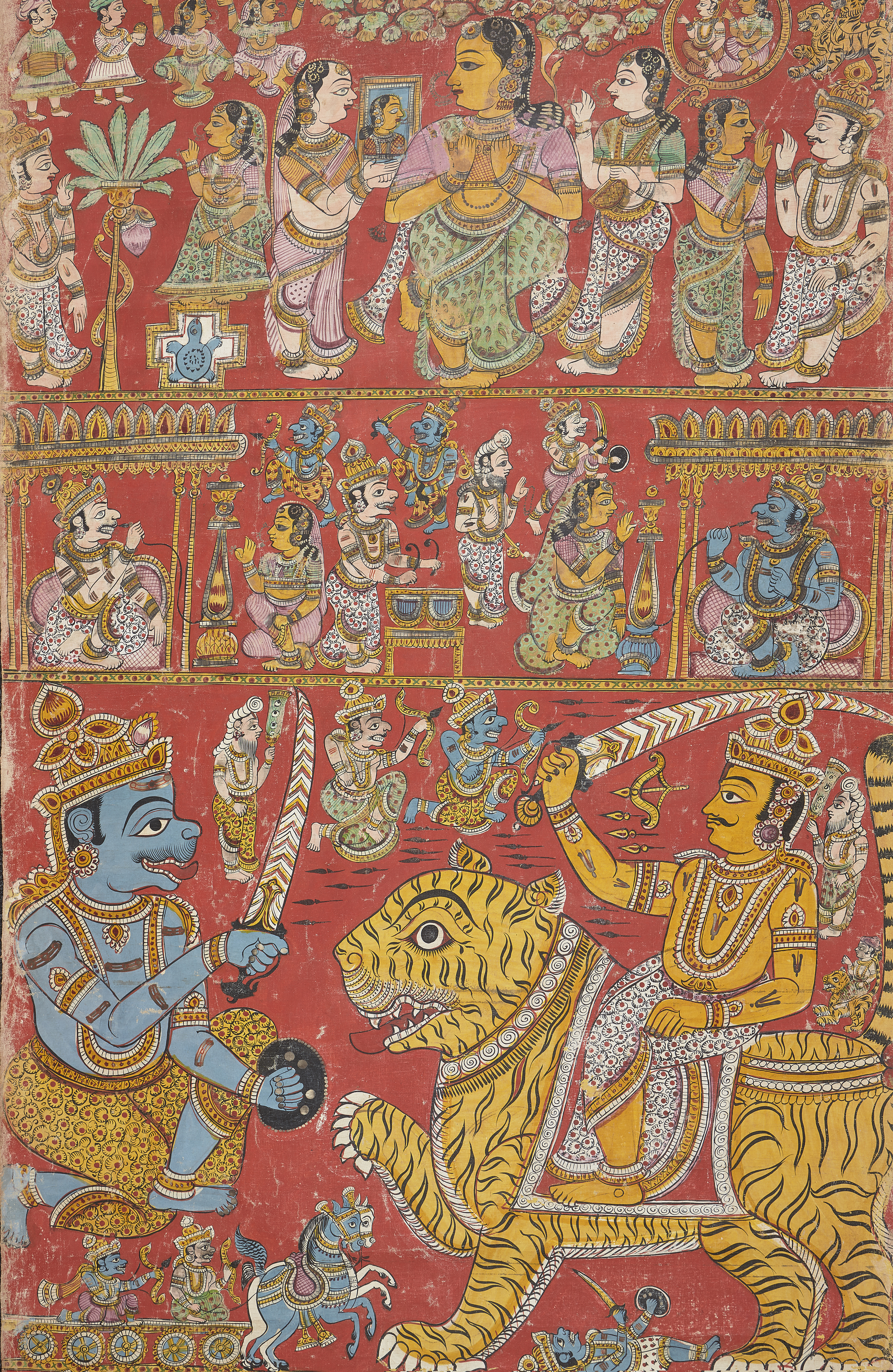
Detail of a Padmasali Purana Scroll, courtesy The Wovensouls Collection, Singapore

in 1767. Holwell, states Urs App, "presented it as the opinion of knowledgeable Indians; But it is abundantly clear that no knowledgeable Indian would ever have said anything remotely similar".

Modern scholarship doubts this 19th-century premise. Ludo Rocher, for example, states,

I want to stress the fact that it would be irresponsible and highly misleading to speak of or pretend to describe the religion of the Puranas.

— Ludo Rocher, The Puranas

The study of Puranas as religious texts remains a controversial subject. Some Indologists, in the colonial tradition of scholarship, treat the Puranic texts as scriptures, or as useful sources of religious contents. Other scholars, such as Ronald Inden, consider this approach "essentialist and antihistorical" because the Purana texts changed often over time and over distance, and the underlying presumption of them being religious texts is that those changes are "Hinduism expressed by a religious leader or philosopher", or the "expressiveness of Hindu mind", or "society at large", when the texts and passages are literary works and "individual geniuses of their authors".

==== Jainism ====
The Jaina Puranas are like Hindu Puranas encyclopedic epics in style, and are considered as anuyogas (expositions), but they are not considered Jain Agamas and do not have scripture or quasi-canonical status in Jainism tradition. They are best described, states John Cort, as post-scripture literary corpus based upon themes found in Jain scriptures.

==== Sectarian, pluralistic or monotheistic theme ====
Scholars have debated whether the Puranas should be categorized as sectarian, or non-partisan, or monotheistic religious texts. Different Puranas describe a number of stories where Brahma, Vishnu, and Shiva compete for supremacy. In some Puranas, such as Devi Bhagavata Purana, the Goddess Devi joins the competition and ascends for the position of being Supreme. Further, most Puranas emphasize legends around one who is either Shiva, or Vishnu, or Devi. The texts thus appear to be sectarian. However, states Edwin Bryant, while these legends sometimes appear to be partisan, they are merely acknowledging the obvious question of whether one or the other is more important, more powerful. In the final analysis, all Puranas weave their legends to celebrate pluralism, and accept the other two and all gods in Hindu pantheon as personalized form but equivalent essence of the Ultimate Reality called Brahman. The Puranas are not spiritually partisan, states Bryant, but "accept and indeed extol the transcendent and absolute nature of the other, and of the Goddess Devi too".

[The Puranic text] merely affirm that the other deity is to be considered a derivative manifestation of their respective deity, or in the case of Devi, the Shakti, or power of the male divinity. The term monotheism, if applied to the Puranic tradition, needs to be understood in the context of a supreme being, whether understood as Vishnu, Shiva or Devi, who can manifest himself or herself as other supreme beings.

— Edwin Bryant, Krishna: The Beautiful Legend of God: Srimad Bhagavata Purana

Ludo Rocher, in his review of Puranas as sectarian texts, states, "even though the Puranas contain sectarian materials, their sectarianism should not be interpreted as exclusivism in favor of one god to the detriment of all others".

=== Puranas as historical texts ===
Despite the diversity and wealth of manuscripts from ancient and medieval India that have survived into the modern times, there is a paucity of historical data in them. Neither the author name nor the year of their composition were recorded or preserved, over the centuries, as the documents were copied from one generation to another. This paucity tempted 19th-century scholars to use the Puranas as a source of chronological and historical information about India or Hinduism. This effort was, after some effort, either summarily rejected by some scholars, or become controversial, because the Puranas include fables and fiction, and the information within and across the Puranas was found to be inconsistent.

In early 20th-century, some regional records were found to be more consistent, such as for the Hindu dynasties in Telangana, Andhra Pradesh. Basham, as well as Kosambi, have questioned whether lack of inconsistency is sufficient proof of reliability and historicity. More recent scholarship has attempted to, with limited success, states Ludo Rocher, use the Puranas for historical information in combination with independent corroborating evidence, such as "epigraphy, archaeology, Buddhist literature, Jaina literature, non-Puranic literature, Islamic records, and records preserved outside India by travelers to or from India in medieval times such as in China, Myanmar and Indonesia".

== Manuscripts ==
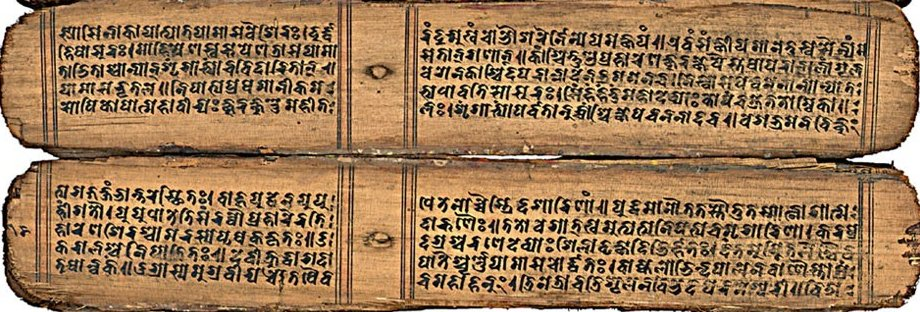
An 11th-century Nepalese palm-leaf manuscript in Sanskrit of Devimahatmya (Markandeya Purana).

The study of Puranas manuscripts has been challenging because they are highly inconsistent. This is true for all Mahapuranas and Upapuranas. Most editions of Puranas, in use particularly by Western scholars, are "based on one manuscript or on a few manuscripts selected at random", even though divergent manuscripts with the same title exist. Scholars have long acknowledged the existence of Purana manuscripts that "seem to differ much from the printed edition", and it is unclear which one is accurate, and whether conclusions drawn from the randomly or cherrypicked printed version were universal over geography or time. This problem is most severe with Purana manuscripts of the same title, but in regional languages such as Tamil, Telugu, Bengali, and others which have largely been ignored.

Modern scholarship noticed all these facts. It recognized that the extent of the genuine Agni Purana was not the same at all times and in all places and that it varied with the difference in time and locality. (...) This shows that the text of the Devi Purana was not the same everywhere but differed considerably in different provinces. Yet, one failed to draw the logical conclusion: besides the version or versions of Puranas that appear in our [surviving] manuscripts, and fewer still in our [printed] editions, there have been numerous other versions, under the same titles, but which either have remained unnoticed or have been irreparably lost.

— Ludo Rocher, The Puranas

=== Chronology ===
Newly discovered Puranas manuscripts from the medieval centuries have attracted scholarly attention and the conclusion that the Puranic literature has gone through slow redaction and text corruption over time, as well as sudden deletion of numerous chapters and its replacement with new content to an extent that the currently circulating Puranas are entirely different from those that existed before 11th century, or 16th century.

For example, a newly discovered palm-leaf manuscript of Skanda Purana in Nepal has been dated to be from 810 CE but is entirely different from versions of Skanda Purana that have been circulating in South Asia since the colonial era. Further discoveries of four more manuscripts, each different, suggest that document has gone through major redactions twice, first likely before the 12th century, and the second very large change sometime in the 15th-16th century for unknown reasons. The different versions of manuscripts of Skanda Purana suggest that "minor" redactions, interpolations, and corruption of the ideas in the text over time.

Rocher states that the date of the composition of each Purana remains a contested issue. Dimmitt and van Buitenen state that each of the Puranas manuscripts is encyclopedic in style, and it is difficult to ascertain when, where, why and by whom these were written:

As they exist today, the Puranas are stratified literature. Each titled work consists of material that has grown by numerous accretions in successive historical eras. Thus no Purana has a single date of composition. (...) It is as if they were libraries to which new volumes have been continuously added, not necessarily at the end of the shelf, but randomly.

— Cornelia Dimmitt and J.A.B. van Buitenen, Classical Hindu Mythology: A Reader in the Sanskrit Puranas

=== Forgeries ===
Many of the extant manuscripts were written on palm leaf or copied during the British India colonial era, some in the 19th century. The scholarship on various Puranas, has suffered from frequent forgeries, states Ludo Rocher, where liberties in the transmission of Puranas were normal and those who copied older manuscripts replaced words or added new content to fit the theory that the colonial scholars were keen on publishing.

=== Translations ===
Horace Hayman Wilson published one of the earliest English translations of one version of the Vishnu Purana in 1840. The same manuscript, and Wilson's translation, was reinterpreted by Manmatha Nath Dutt and published in 1896. The All India Kashiraj Trust has published editions of the Puranas.

Marinas Poullé (Mariyadas Pillai) published a French translation from a Tamil version of the Bhagavata Purana in 1788, and this was widely distributed in Europe becoming an introduction to the 18th-century Hindu culture and Hinduism to many Europeans during the colonial era. Poullé republished a different translation of the same text as Le Bhagavata in 1795, from Pondicherry. A copy of Poullé translation is preserved in Bibliothèque nationale de France, Paris.

== Influence ==
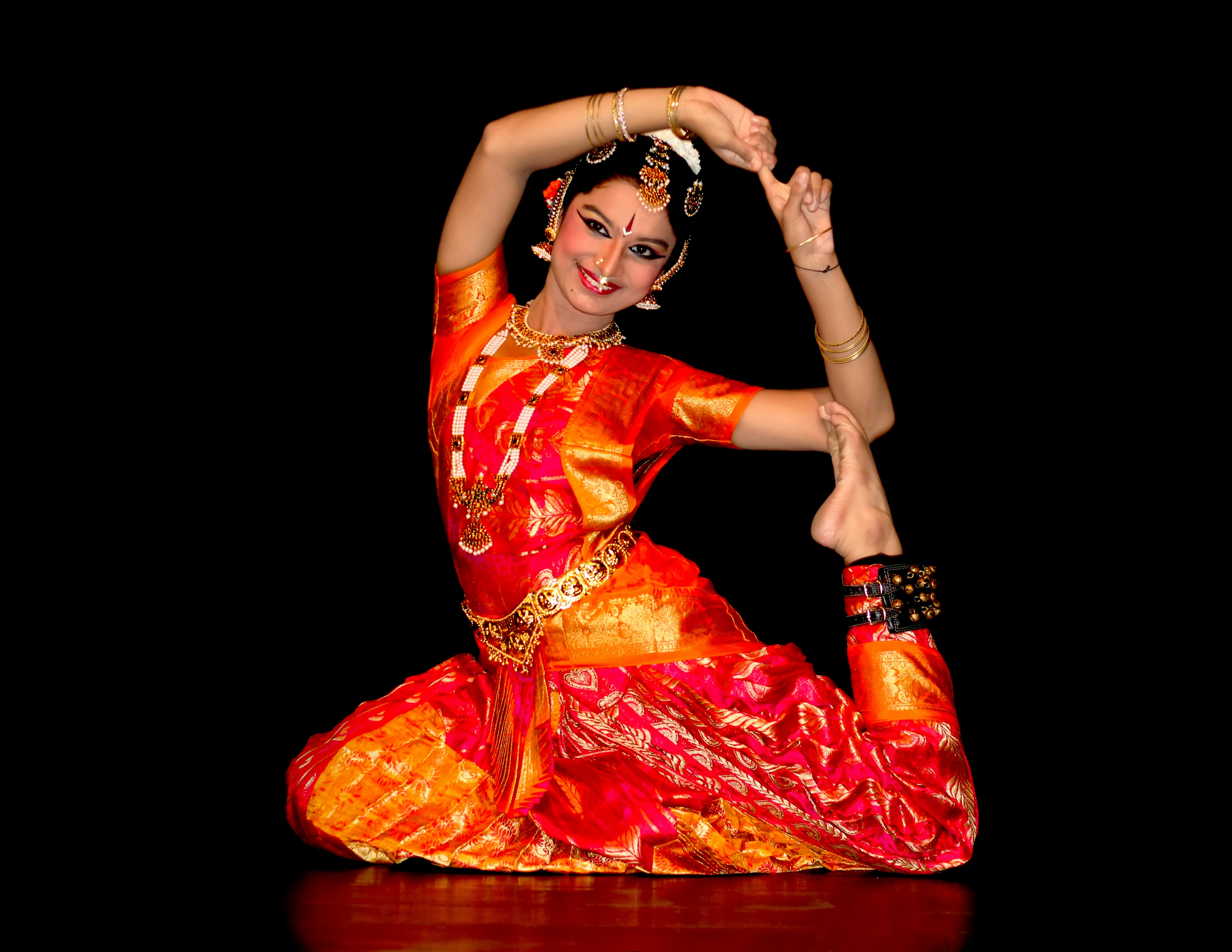
The Puranas have had a large cultural impact on Hindus, from festivals to diverse arts. The dance Bharatanatyam (above) is inspired in part by the Bhagavata Purana.

The most significant influence of the Puranas genre of Indian literature has been, stated scholars and particularly Indian scholars, in "culture synthesis", in weaving and integrating the diverse beliefs from ritualistic rites of passage to Vedantic philosophy, from fictional legends to factual history, from individual introspective yoga to social celebratory festivals, from temples to pilgrimage, from one god to another, from goddesses to tantra, from the old to the new. These have been dynamic open texts, composed socially, over time. This, states Greg Bailey, may have allowed the Hindu culture to "preserve the old while constantly coming to terms with the new", and "if they are anything, they are records of cultural adaptation and transformation" over the last 2,000 years.

The Puranic literature, suggests Khanna, influenced "acculturation and accommodation" of a diversity of people, with different languages and from different economic classes, across different kingdoms and traditions, catalyzing the syncretic "cultural mosaic of Hinduism". They helped influence cultural pluralism in India and are a literary record thereof.

Om Prakash states the Puranas served as an efficient medium for cultural exchange and popular education in ancient and medieval India. These texts adopted, explained, and integrated regional deities such as Pashupata in Vayu Purana, Sattva in Vishnu Purana, Dattatreya in Markendeya Purana, Bhojakas in Bhavishya Purana. Further, states Prakash, they dedicated chapters to "secular subjects such as poetics, dramaturgy, grammar, lexicography, astronomy, war, politics, architecture, geography and medicine as in Agni Purana, perfumery and lapidary arts in Garuda Purana, painting, sculpture and other arts in Vishnudharmottara Purana".

Indian Arts

The cultural influence of the Puranas extended to Indian classical arts, such as songs, dance culture such as Bharata Natyam in south India and Rasa Lila in northeast India, plays and recitations.

Festivals

The myths, lunar calendar schedule, rituals, and celebrations of major Hindu cultural festivities such as Holi, Diwali and Durga Puja are in the Puranic literature.
