= J. A. B. van Buitenen =

Dutch Indologist (1928–1979)

- Born: May 21, 1928; The Hague, Netherlands
- Died: September 21, 1979 (aged 51); Champaign, Illinois, U.S.

Johannes Adrianus Bernardus van Buitenen (21 May 1928 – 21 September 1979) was a Dutch Indologist at the University of Chicago where he was the George V. Bobrinskoy Professor of Sanskrit in the Department of South Asian Languages and Civilizations. He was one of the world's leading Sanskrit scholars. His interests ranged widely over literature, philosophy and philology, but toward the end of his career he focused primarily on the Mahābhārata.

== Biography ==
Van Buitenen studied with Jan Gonda at the Rijksuniversiteit, Utrecht, Netherlands (since 1990 Universiteit Utrecht). He received his doctorate, cum laude, on 23 October 1953 and immediately departed for India where he stayed until 1956 as sub-editor of the " Dictionary of Sanskrit on Historical Principles" project at Deccan College, Poona . From 1959 to 1961 he was Reader in Indian philosophy at Utrecht but found he had little interest in the position or in staying in the Netherlands. As a consequence he happily accepted an invitation to take a position at the University of Chicago and remained there until his death in 1979 at the age of fifty-one. He was appointed associate professor in Sanskrit and Indic studies in 1959 and professor in linguistics in Oriental languages in 1964. After a South Asian languages and civilizations department was formed in 1966, he was chairman for 10 years.

Van Buitenen contributed to the training of several notable scholars in the USA, among them James L. Fitzgerald (Brown University), Walter O. Kaelber, Michael D. Willis, Bruce M. Sullivan (Northern Arizona University) and Bruce Lincoln (University of Chicago).

Van Buitenen was on the board of directors of the American Oriental Society and became a correspondent of the Royal Netherlands Academy of Arts and Sciences in 1963.

Amongst many publications he edited and translated the first five books of the Hindu epic, "The Mahabharata". They were published in three volumes by the University of Chicago Press. At the time of his death he was working on the fourth of seven volumes.

== Publications ==
=== Books ===
- Rāmānuja's Vedārthasangraha. Deccan College Monograph Series. Vol. 16. Poona: Deccan College Postgraduate and Research Institute. 1956.
- Tales of Ancient India. Chicago: University of Chicago Press. 1959.
- The Maitrāyaṇīya Upaniṣad: A Critical Essay, with Text, Translation and Commentary. The Hague. 1962.
- Two Plays of Ancient India: The Little Clay Cart and the Minister's Seal. New York: Columbia University Press. 1968. ISBN 9780231030465.
- Rāmānuja on the Bhagavadgītā: a condensed rendering of his Gītābhāṣya with copious notes and an introduction (Second ed.). Delhi: Motilal Banarsidass. 1968 [1953].
- Yāmuna's Āgama Prāmāṇyam; or, Treatise on the Validity of Pañcarātra. Madras: Ramanuja Research Society. 1968.
- The Mahabharata: Book 1: The Book of the Beginning. Chicago: University of Chicago Press. 1971.
- The Mahabharata: Book 2: The Book of Assembly Hall; Book 3: The Book of the Forest. Chicago: University of Chicago Press. 1975.
- The Mahabharata: Book 4: The Book of the Virata; Book 5: The Book of the Effort. Chicago: University of Chicago Press. 1978.
- The Bhagavadgītā in the Mahābhārata. Chicago: University of Chicago Press. 1981.

=== Selected articles ===
- "Studies in Sāṃkhya (I)". Journal of the American Oriental Society. 76 (3): 153–157. July–September 1956. doi:10.2307/596286. JSTOR 596286.
- "Studies in Sāṃkhya (II)". Journal of the American Oriental Society. 77 (1): 15–25. January–March 1957. doi:10.2307/594871. JSTOR 594871.
- "Studies in Sāṃkhya (III)". Journal of the American Oriental Society. 77 (2): 88–107. April–June 1957. doi:10.2307/594919. JSTOR 594919.
- "The Name "Pañcarātra"". History of Religions. 1 (2): 291–299. Winter 1962. doi:10.1086/462449. JSTOR 1062057. S2CID 224807810.
