= Court of King Janaka =

Royal court in the Ramayana

The court of King Janaka
- जनक दरबार
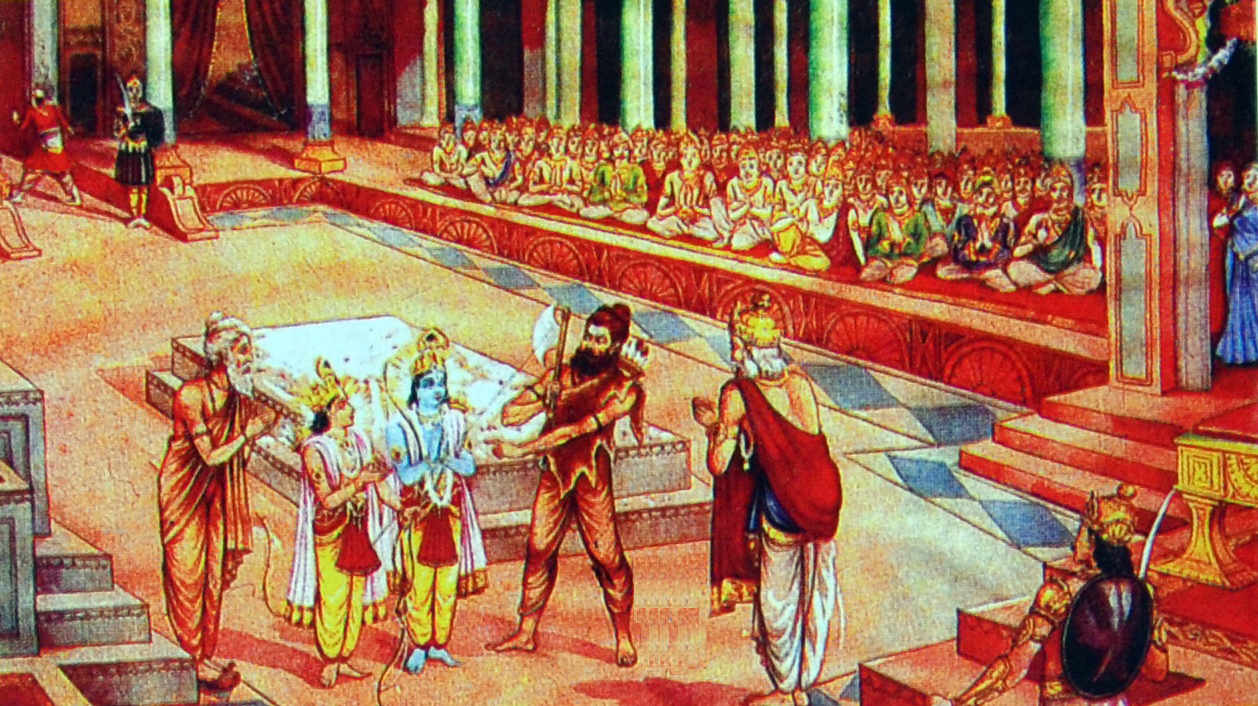
- Artistic painting showing the court of King Janaka in Mithila
- Established: King Janaka
- Jurisdiction: Kingdom of Videha
- Location: Mithila
- Composition method: Royal court
- Authorised by: King Janaka
- Language: Sanskrit and Maithili
- Type of tribunal: Council of learned Brahmins - Vedic Parishad

Naiyayika

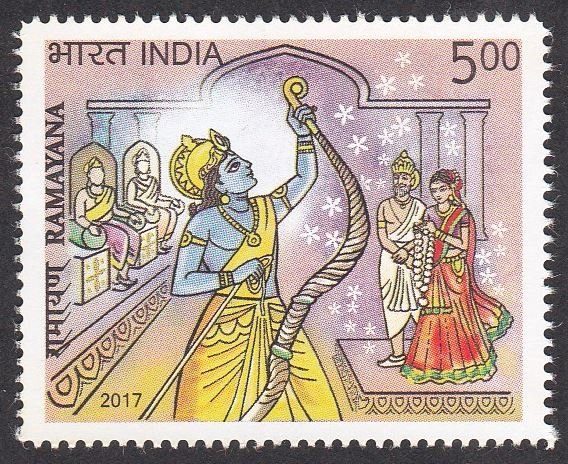
Indian postal stamp depicting the court of King Janaka in Mithila, where Rama lifted the legendary bow Pinaka of Shiva.

The Court of King Janaka (Maithili: जनक दरबार) refers to the scholarly assembly at the royal court of the King Janaka in the ancient Kingdom of Videha also known as Mithila in the Indian subcontinent. Apart from being a royal court, it was a major centre for the scholarly assembly in the Indian subcontinent, where scholars and Brahmins from the different parts of the subcontinent gathered to take part in the scholarly conferences held at the court. The court of King Janaka in the ancient Indian subcontinent has been mentioned in the major texts Ramayana, Puranas, Mahabharata, Brahmanas, and the Upanishads. It is an important location described in the legendary stories of the epic Ramayana. Rama and Sita in Hinduism were married at the court of King Janaka in Mithila.

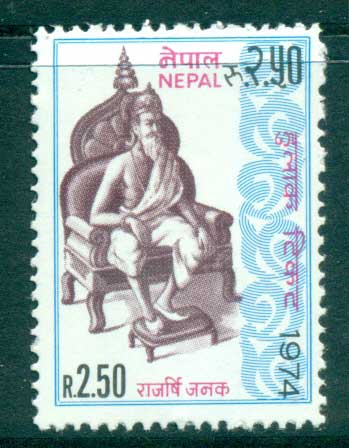
Nepal's postal stamp depicting Janaka sitting on his throne at the court of his Kingdom.

== Description ==
According to Puranas, Mithi was the first king, who ascended the royal throne at the court of King Janaka in Mithila. He was the son of the King Nimi in the ancient Kingdom of Videha. In the text Brihada Vishnu Purana, there is a list of 54 Janakas, who later ascended the royal throne at the court of King Janaka in Mithila.

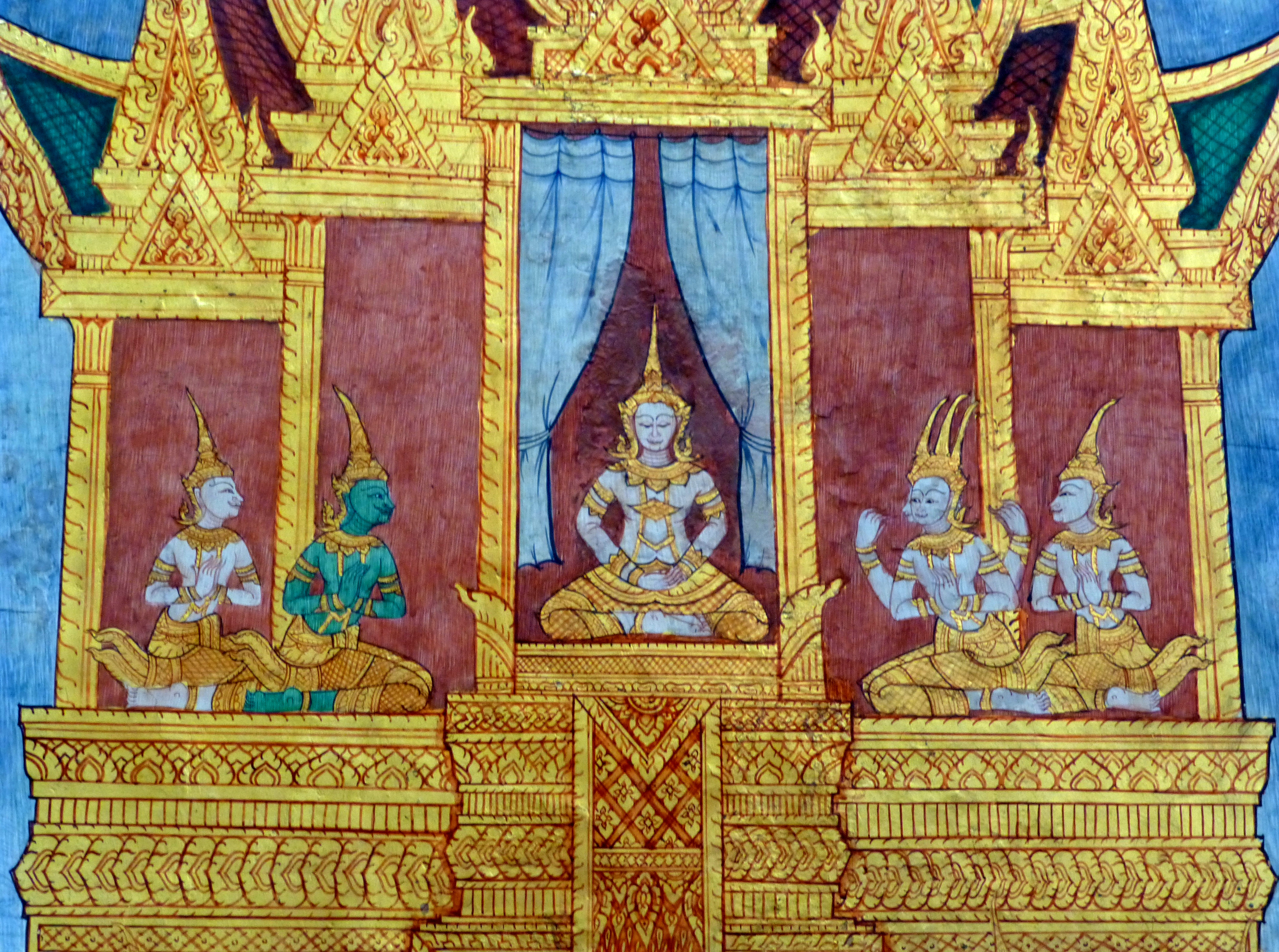
Thai depiction of the King Nimi sitting at his court

In the epic Ramayana, the court of King Janaka is famous for conducting Sita Svayamvara competition for the marriage of the princess Sita of Mithila. In the competition, the kings or princes of all the kingdoms in the ancient Indian subcontinent (Āryāvarta), participated. The competition for the legendary Sita Svayamvara is a major event in the Ramayana. There was a condition in the competition. The condition for winning in the competition of was to lift the legendary bow Pinaka of Shiva kept at the court of King Janaka. In the ceremony of the Sita Svayamvara, Rama along with his brother Lakshmana and Vishvamitra also arrived. They were welcomed by the King Siradhwaja Janaka at the court. In the competition no one was able to lift the legendary bow Pinaka. Then in last, Rama successfully lifted the legendary bow and finally it was broken. After the legendary bow Pinaka was broken, the sage Parashurama angrily came to the court of the King Janaka, to know who had broken it by

According to Upanishads, the court of King Janaka was the centre of attraction for Vedic scholars all over the subcontinent. It is associated with the philosophical text Brihadaranyaka Upanishad. The eminent Vedic scholar Yajnavalkya became famous from the scholarly Bahudakshina Yajna held at the assembly of the court. He later codified the Hindu law in his text Yajnavalkya Smriti. The court of King Janaka was a prominent seat for Sanskrit and Vedic learning in Mithila.

In Mahabharata, the sage Veda Vyasa sent his own son Shuka to the court of King Janaka for learning spiritual knowledge from the philosopher King Janaka. In the texts Puranas and Mahabharata, there is description about an examination taken by the King Janaka to test the knowledge and understanding of the young scholar Shuka.

== Ministers and advisors ==
According to the records of the Hindu texts, King Janaka used to appoint his ministers and advisors from the victorious scholars participating in shastrarthas (scholarly debates) organised by the King Janaka at his court.

According to the text Vishnu Purana, the founder King Nimi initially invited to the Vedic sage Brahmarshi Vashishtha as his chief advisor cum priest for conducting a Yajna at his court. But the sage Vashishtha was already invited by the Indra for conducting a long Yajna at his court in the Svarga, before the invitation of the King Nimi. Therefore, the sage Vashishtha went to the court of the Indra. Then, later the King Nimi invited other Vedic sage Gautama Maharishi as his chief advisor cum priest for conducting the Yajna at his court. The sage Gautama accepted the invitation for becoming his chief advisor cum priest and conducted the Yajna in the absence of the sage Vashishtha. It is said that when the sage Vashishtha returned to the court of King Nimi, he saw the Yajna was completed by the sage Gautama Maharishi. After knowing the completion of the Yajna in his absence, Brahmarshi Vashishtha became angry and cursed the King Nimi that his soul would be removed from his body. After listening the curse from Vashishtha, the King Nimi also cursed the same to the sage Vashishtha.

Symbolic statue of Maharshi Gautama at Uchchaith Sthan.

During the period of King Siradhvaja Janaka in the Ramayana, the chief advisor at the royal court of the King Janaka was Shatananda, the son of the Vedic sage Gautama Maharishi. In the text Brihadaranyaka Upanishad, there is mention of a Brahmin scholar Ashvala as the chief advisor of King Kriti Janaka during the occasion of the scholarly contest Bahudakshina Yajna at the assembly of the court. In the scholarly contest of the Bahudakshina Yajna, the revered Vedic sage Yajnavalkya defeated all the Brahmins who debated with him on Vedic knowledge, at the court. He was declared as the Brahmishtha among all the Brahmin scholars present at the assembly of the court. He was later appointed as the chief advisor cum minister at the court by the King Janaka of Mithila.

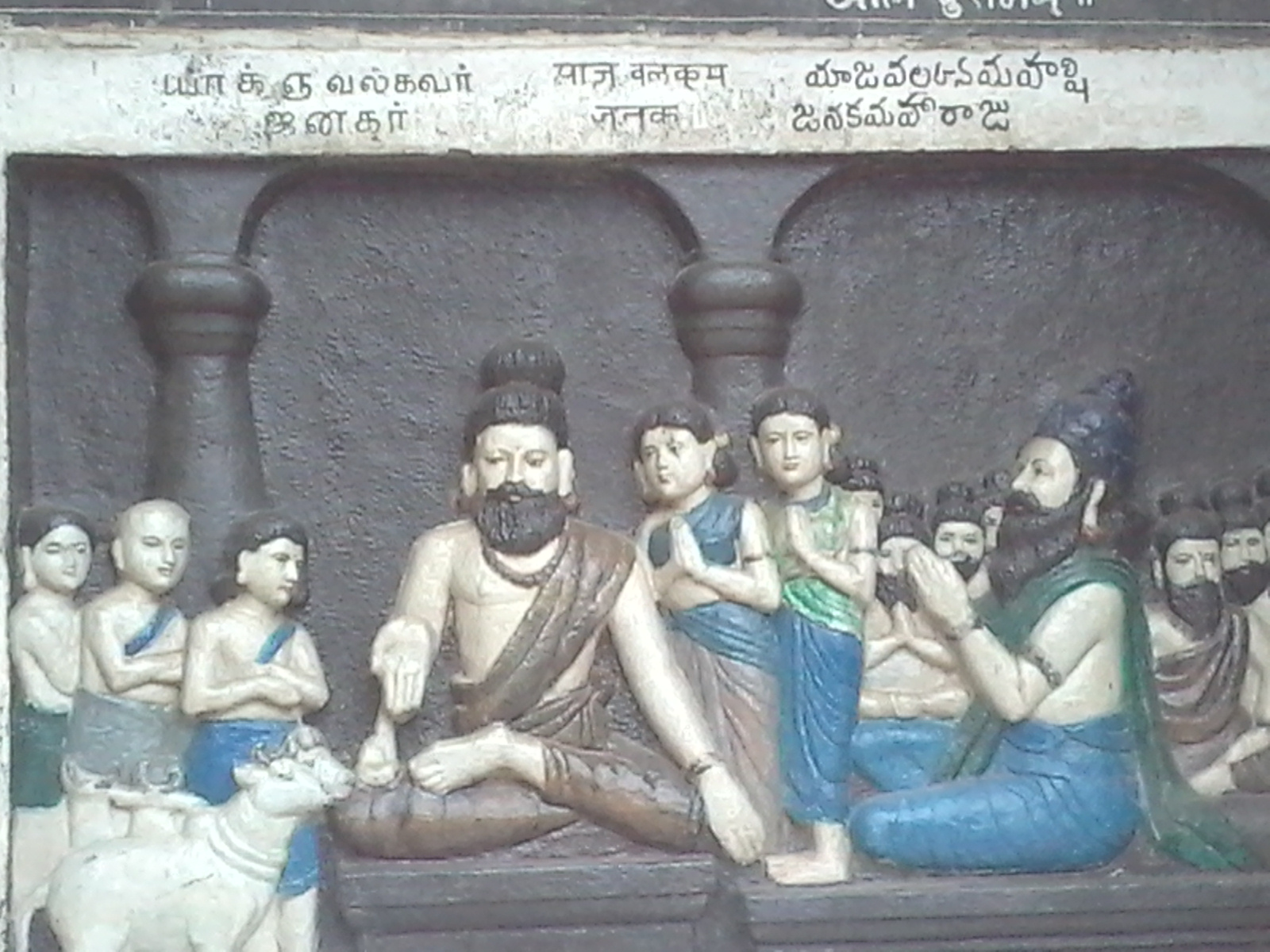
The Vedic sage Yajnavalkya preaching to the King Janaka in Mithila

In the Vana Parva section of Mahabharata, there is mention of Acharya Bandi, the son of Varuna Devata, as the chief advisor at the court of King Ugrasena Janaka in Mithila. He was known for instituting the punishment called as "Jala Samadhi" for the defeated Brahmin scholars in the Shastrarthas organised at the court. He defeated several scholars in the Shastrarthas held at the court and sent them to Jala Samadhi. He also defeated the Vedic sage Kahoda, the father of Ashtavakra.

Later, when the little Ashtavakra grew up and attained the age of tenth, he came to know the reason of the death of his father. After knowing the reason of the death of his father, he pledged to challenge and defeat Acharya Bandi at the court of the King Janaka in Mithila. Then, he along with his maternal uncle Shvetaketu went to the court of King Janaka in Mithila. When they approached to the gate of the court, the gatekeeper stopped them to enter the assembly of the court. But suddenly when the King Janaka got notice of the arrival of the two young Brahmins at the gate of the court, he ordered the gatekeeper to allow them to enter at assembly of the court. The young Ashtavakra, after entering at the assembly of the court, challenged the acharya Bandi to do Shastrartha with him. Bandi accepted the challenge, but in the Shastrartha he was defeated by the young Brahmin Ashtavakra. Later, after the defeat of Bandi, the King Janaka appointed Ashtavakra as his chief advisor. Later, Ashtavakra preached the philosophy of self to the King Janaka at his court. The philosophical discourse between the sage Ashtavakra and the King Janaka is recorded as the text Ashtavakra Gita.

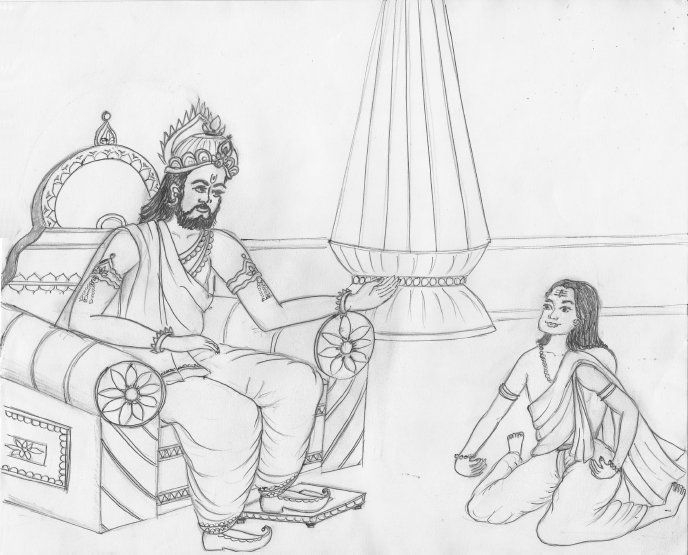
An artistic painting showing Ashtavakra preaching to the King Janaka at his court.

In the Shanti Parva section of the text Mahabharata, there is mention of a King Janaka, whose advisor was the Vedic sage Parashara, the father of Veda Vyasa. The Vedic sage Parashara preached the King Janaka about the philosophy of karma-sanyasa. The philosophical discourse between the Vedic sage Parashara and the King Janaka is recorded as the text Parashara Gita.

In Moksha-dharma Parva sub section of the section Shanti Parva in the text Mahabharata, once King Janadeva Janaka asked a hundred acharyas of his court philosophical questions about salvation, but none of them could give satisfactory answers to his questions about salvation. Then by chance a sage named Panchashikha entered the court and he told the king the means of attaining salvation. The King Janadeva Janaka was satisfied and impressed by the answer of the sage Panchashikha. After that he abandoned his hundred acharyas and appointed Panchashikha as his chief advisor. Then, the chief advisor Panchashikha at the court, taught Janadeva Janaka about the philosophy of Brahmavidya and Shankhya Shastra.

== Female scholars at the court ==
The Vedic texts mention the presence of women scholars called Brahmavadini at the court of King Janaka in Mithila. During the contest of the Bahudakshina Yajna, the Brahmavadini Gargi Vachaknavi was present at court. She debated with the sage Yajnavalkya and asked questions related to the principle of ultimate existence. The sage replied to all her questions.

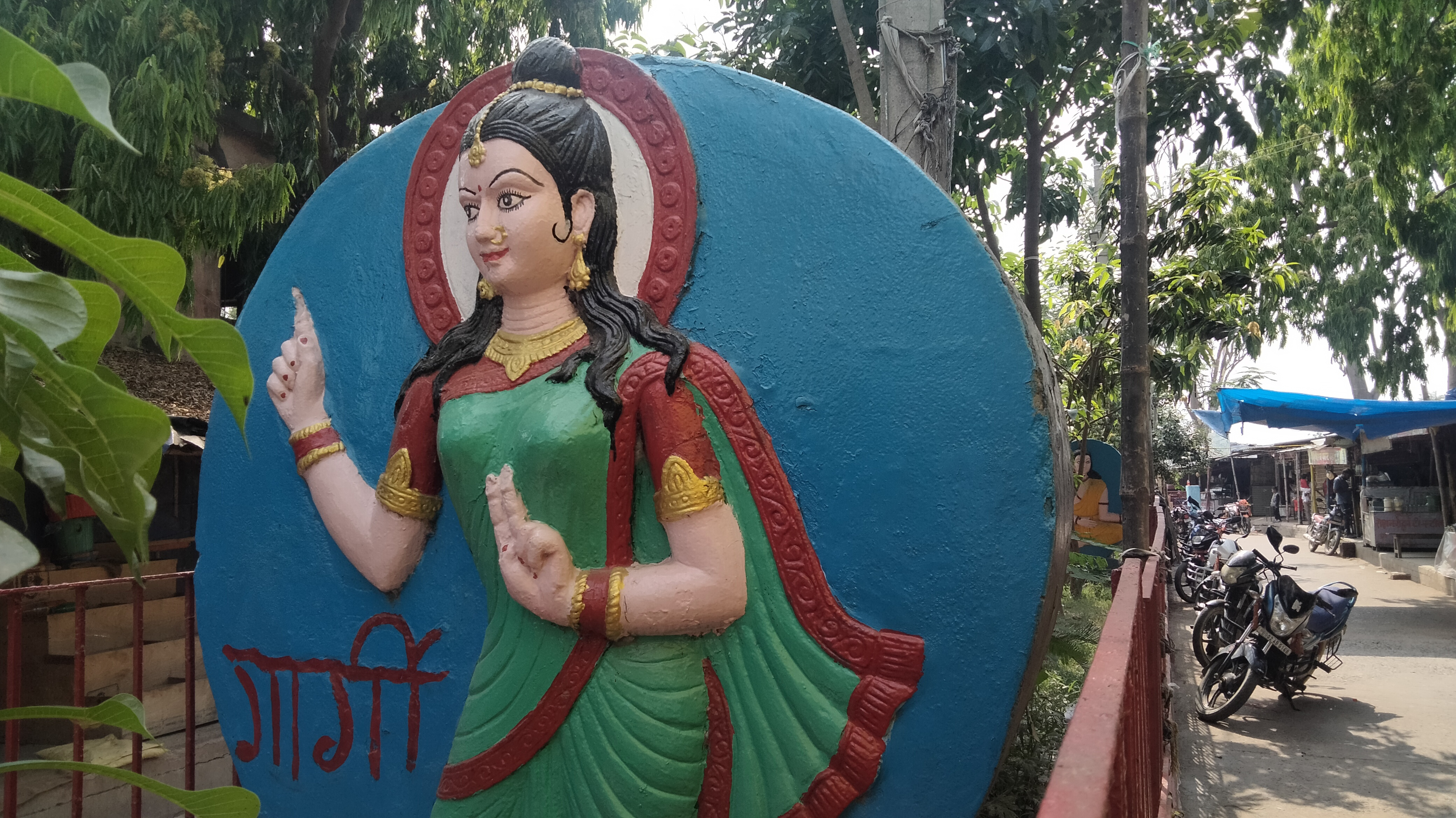
Statue of Gargi at the premises of the Uchchaith Bhagwati Mandir in Mithila

Similarly during the period of the King Dharmadhwaja Janaka, the other Brahmavadini Sulabha arrived at his court. She debated with the king. The debate between the lady scholar Sulabha and the King Dharmadhwaja Janaka is mentioned in the Shanti Parva of the Mahabharata. In the text, the debate between Sulabha and Janaka, is narrated by Bhishma to Yudhishthira during their philosophical discourse.

== Vedic Parishad ==
The Vedic Parishad at the court of King Janaka refers to the council of learned Brahmins, which held philosophical debates among the learned Brahmins. It was basically a council of debate at the court of King Janaka in Mithila. According to Vidyabhushana, the science of logic developed out of the Vedic parishad. Some renowned logicians in the council of debate were Ashtavakra, Akshapada Gautama, and Yajnavalkya, etc.

The Vedic sage Akshapada Gautama at the court of King Janaka was the founder of the foundational text Nyaya Sutra in the tradition of Nyaya school of the ancient Indian Philosophy. The philosophy of Nyaya Shastra is one of the six schools in the ancient Indian Philosophy.
