= Ashtavakra (epic) =

Hindi epic poem

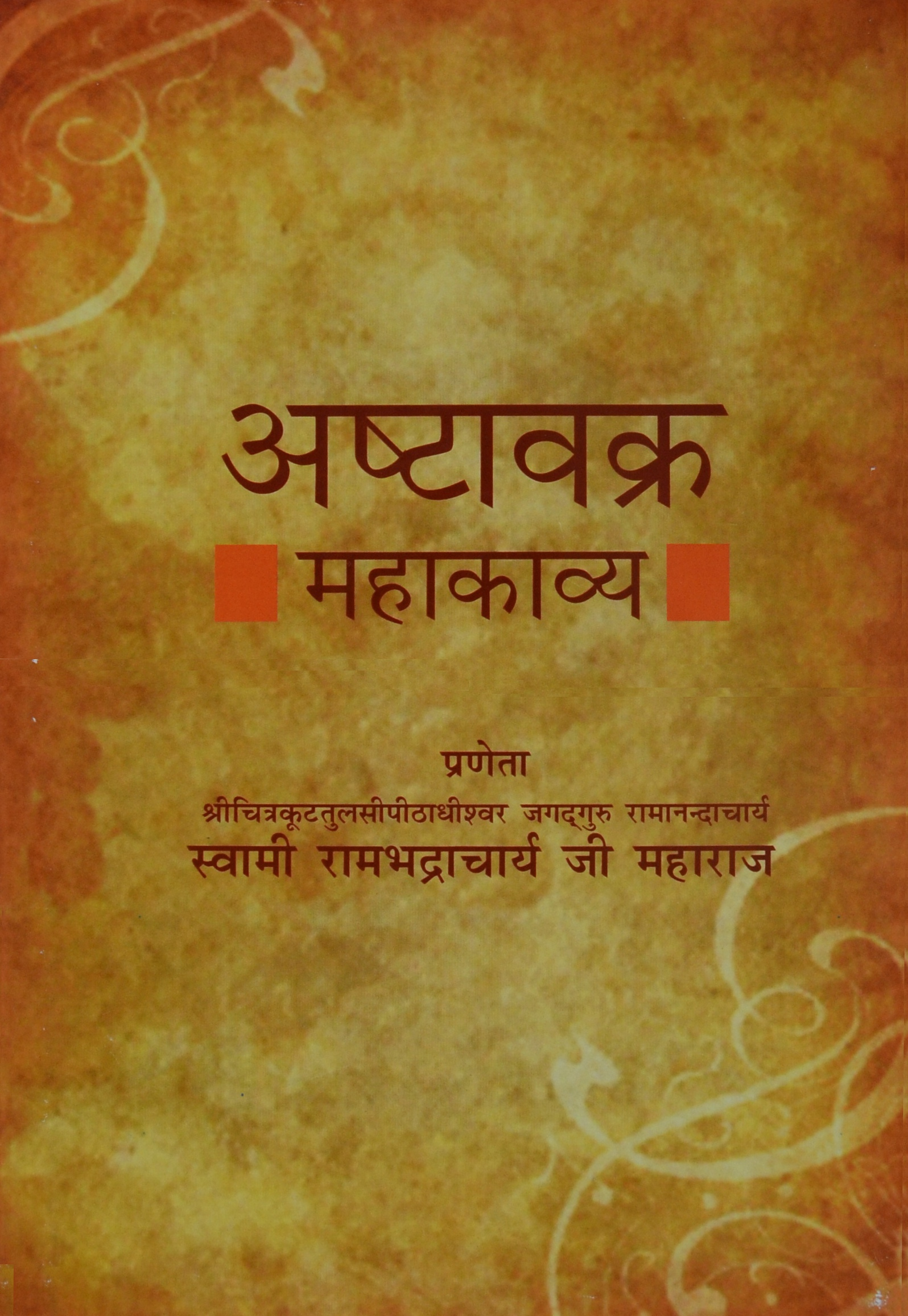
- Cover page of Ashtavakra (epic), first edition
- Author: Jagadguru Rambhadracharya
- Original title: Aṣṭāvakra (Epic Poem)
- Language: Hindi
- Genre: Epic Poetry
- Publisher: Jagadguru Rambhadracharya Handicapped University
- Publication date: 14 January 2010
- Publication place: India
- Media type: Print (hardcover)
- Pages: 223 pp (first edition)

Aṣṭāvakra (2010) is a Hindi epic poem (Mahakavya) composed by Jagadguru Rambhadracharya (1950–) in the year 2009. It consists of 864 verses in 8 cantos (sargas) of 108 verses each. The poem presents the narrative of the Ṛṣi Aṣṭāvakra which is found in the Hindu scriptures of the Rāmāyaṇa and the Mahābhārata. A copy of the epic was published by the Jagadguru Rambhadracharya Handicapped University, Chitrakuta, Uttar Pradesh. The book was released on 14 January 2010, on the sixtieth birthday (Ṣaṣṭipūrti) of the poet.

The protagonist of the epic, Aṣṭāvakra, is physically disabled with eight deformities in his body. The epic presents his journey from adversity to success to final redemption. According to the poet, who is also disabled having lost his eyesight at the age of two months, the notions of aphoristic solutions for universal difficulties of the disabled are presented the epic, and the eight cantos are the analyses of the eight dispositions in the mind of the disabled.

== Narrative ==
The epic narrates the life of Aṣṭāvakra as found in the Rāmāyaṇa of Vālmīki, the Vana parva of the Mahābhārata, the Aṣṭāvakra Gītā and the play Uttararamacarita by Bhavabhuti. The sage Uddālaka, the Ṛṣi mentioned in the Chandogya Upaniṣad, has a disciple by the name Kahoda. Uddālaka offers his daughter Sujātā in marriage to Kahoda, and the newly-wed couple starts living in an Āśrama in a forest. Sujātā becomes pregnant after some years. The child, while still in the womb, one day tells its father Kahoda that he is making eight errors in each Vedic Mantra while reciting them at night. Enraged, Kahoda curses the child to be born with all eight limbs (feet, knees, hands, chest and head) deformed.

Meanwhile, there is a drought in the forest and Sujātā sends Kahoda to Mithilā to earn some money from King Janaka. A courtier of Janaka, Bandī (Vandī) defeats Kahoda in Śāstrārtha (verbal duel on the meaning of scriptures) and immerses the Ṛṣi under water using the Varuṇapāśa. Uddālaka apprises Sujātā of her husband's fate and asks her to keep the events secret from her child.

The child born to Sujātā is named Aṣṭāvakra by Uddālaka. At the same time a son is born to Uddālaka and is named Śvetaketu. Aṣṭāvakra and Śvetaketu grow up like brothers, and learn the scriptures from Uddālaka. Aṣṭāvakra thinks Uddālaka is his father and Śvetaketu his brother. At the age of ten years, on learning that his real father is imprisoned by Bandī, Aṣṭāvakra decides to go to Mithilā to free his father. Aṣṭāvakra travels to Mithilā with his uncle Śvetaketu and defeats respectively the gatekeeper, king Janaka and Bandī in Śāstrārtha, and then secures the release of his father Kahoda.

On their way back home, Kahoda makes Aṣṭāvakra bathe in the river Samaṅgā and Aṣṭāvakra becomes free of the eight deformities in his body. At the end, Aṣṭāvakra, inspired by the sage Vasiṣṭha, arrives in the court of Sītā and Rāma, and is elated to be honoured in the assembly of Ayodhyā.

=== The-eight cantos ===
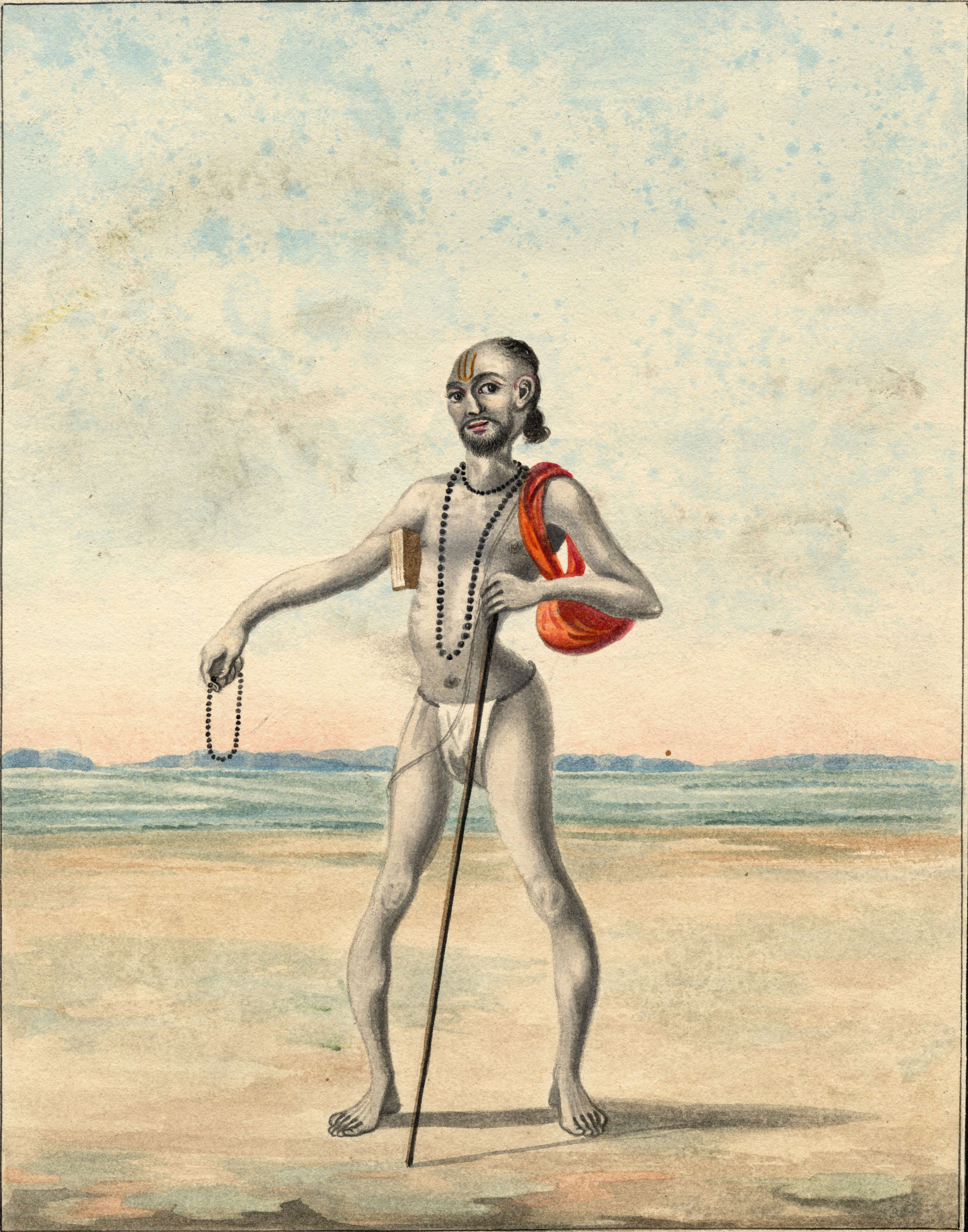
Ashtavakra as depicted in an early 19th-century painting from Patna.

1. Sambhava (Hindi: सम्भव, meaning Appearance): After invoking Sarasvatī, the poet introduces Aṣṭāvakra as the subject of the epic, who became the flag-bearer of the disabled. The sage Uddālaka stays with his wife in a Gurukula with 10,000 disciples. The couple have a daughter, Sujātā, who grows up learning the Vedas with the disciples. Uddālaka has a famous disciple by the name Kahola. At the end of his education, Kahola is requested by Uddālaka to marry a Brāhmaṇa woman who is suitable for him in all ways and enter Gārhasthya Āśrama. Kahola thinks of Sujātā but is hesitant as he is not certain if marrying the daughter of his Guru would be appropriate. Uddālaka learns of Kahola's disposition, and happily offers Sujātā in marriage to Kahola. Uddālaka also prophesies that Sujātā will bear him a son who will become a source of inspiration for the disabled. Kahola and Sujātā get married and choose a desolate forest for their Āśrama, where Kahola starts teaching disciples. Sujātā prays to Sūrya for a son whose life will offer solutions to the afflictions of the disabled, and Sūrya grants her the wish. The canto ends with Sujātā becoming pregnant and the couple delighted.
2. Saṅkrānti (Hindi: सङ्क्रान्ति, meaning Revolution): In the first 27 verses (first quarter) of the canto, the poet expounds on Saṅkrānti, the concept of true revolution. It is not to be attained by spilling blood, but by spreading a thought. Rarely do people want such a revolution, their egos do not allow it. The narrative then proceeds – after the Puṃsavana and Sīmantonnayana Saṃskāras of Sujātā, one day, late in the night, Kahola is practising Vedic chanting, perfecting his knowledge of what he is to teach his disciples on the following day. Out of fatigue and the four defects of Bhrama, Pramāda, Vipralipsā and Karaṇāpāṭava, Kahola starts erring in all eight types of recitations – Jaṭā, Rekhā, Mālā, Śikhā, Ratha, Dhvaja, Daṇḍa, and Ghana. The child of Sujātā, while still in the womb, thinks about this for some time and then asks his father to stop practising and teaching verses incorrectly, pointing out that the sage is making eight errors in reciting each verse. Kahola is taken aback and asks the child in the womb to stay quiet, saying he is reciting as per tradition, and forgetfulness is only human. The child replies by saying that the father should throw away the old corpse of so-called tradition and again requests Kahola to learn the Vedas once more from Uddālaka. The enraged Kahola curses the child to be born with all eight limbs crooked. Kahola repents immediately after, but the child (Aṣṭāvakra) takes the curse in his stride, and asks his father not to repent.
3. Samasyā (Hindi: समस्या, meaning Difficulty): This canto, a soliloquy by Aṣṭāvakra in his mother's womb, deals with the notion of Samasyā or a difficulty. The canto is replete with pathos (Karuṇa Rasa), heroism (Vīra Rasa) and optimism. In the first 30 verses, various metaphors are painted for difficulty, which is universal and extremely powerful. Faith in God and determined action are the ways to get out of a difficulty, and Aṣṭāvakra is resolute that he will get out of his predicament too. In verses 61 to 82, the real nature of the Ātman (Self), without beginning and end, without birth and death, and beyond mortal difficulties is presented, according to the poet's philosophy of Viśiṣṭādvaita. Aṣṭāvakra then tells Kahola about his (Kahola's) imminent repentance, and that he is determined intent to live the life of a disabled. He requests his father not to curse anybody in future, and the canto ends with optimistic prophesies by Aṣṭāvakra that the curse of his father is a blessing in disguise for the disabled of the world, as Aṣṭāvakra will be their role model.
4. Saṅkaṭa (Hindi: सङ्कट, meaning Adversity): The poet introduces the concept of adversity, which is a test for friendship, skill, intellect, and virtues. Aṣṭāvakra's body becomes like that of the egg of a turtle. Kahola starts repenting for his action of cursing the child. The sin of the Ṛṣi manifests as a drought in the forest, and all the disciples of Kahola leave the Āśrama. The birds and animals in the forest start dying out of hunger and thirst. Sujātā asks Kahola to go to the Yajña of Janaka and get some wealth by defeating the assembly of the wise in a scriptural debate. Kahola goes to Mithilā against his wishes, and is beaten in the debate by Bandī, the son of Varuṇa, who then immerses Kahola under water in the Varuṇapāśa. In the forest, Sujātā gives birth to a boy. Uddālaka comes to the aid of Sujātā and tells her about the fate of Kahola, asking her to keep this secret from her child, as the knowledge of his father's defeat will be a hurdle in the growth of the child. Uddālaka performs the Jātakarman Saṃskāra of the infant. The child is called Aṣṭavakra (having eight limbs deformed) by everybody, but Uddālaka names him Aṣṭāvakra, with the meanings as explained here. The canto ends with Aṣṭāvakra starting to grow in the Āśrama of his maternal grandfather.
5. Saṅkalpa (Hindi: सङ्कल्प, meaning Resolution): The canto begins with the concept of resolution – the poet states that a noble resolution is the true and pure resolution. Aṣṭāvakra is born handicapped, and a son Śvetaketu is born to Uddālaka at the same time. Both uncle and nephew grow up together in Uddālaka's Āśrama. Uddālaka is more fond of Aṣṭāvakra, his disabled grandson, than Śvetaketu. Aṣṭāvakra excels in learning from Uddālaka, outclassing all other disciples including Śvetaketu. On Aṣṭāvakra's tenth birthday, Uddālaka organises a celebration. Uddālaka makes Aṣṭāvakra sit in his lap and starts embracing him. Seeing this, Śvetaketu is possessed by jealousy, and asks Aṣṭāvakra to get down from his father's lap. Śvetaketu tells him that Uddālaka is actually his grandfather, and that he does not know about his real father. Śvetaketu further humiliates Aṣṭāvakra by mocking his disability. On hearing about his real father Kahola from Sujātā, Aṣṭāvakra thanks Śvetaketu for awakening him. Aṣṭāvakra makes a firm resolution of not returning to Uddālaka's Āśrama without his father. The resolution will show the world that the disabled can achieve anything they dream of.
6. Sādhanā (Hindi: साधना, meaning Diligence): The poet explains that Sādhanā (diligence), the energy of Saṅkalpa (resolution), is the key to success. Aṣṭāvakra is constantly worried about how he would liberate his father from the bondage of Bandī. He realises that his pointing out of Kahola's mistakes and arguing with Kahola was not his prerogative, even though Kahola was wrong. He concludes that his arguments ended up angering Kahola which led to the unfortunate curse, anger being the dreadful enemy of man. Aṣṭāvakra decides to perfect the scriptures – the Vedas, Upavedas, Nyāya, Mīmāṃsā, Dharma, Āgama and other texts. He entreats Uddālaka for instruction in the scriptures. In a short time, Aṣṭāvakra masters all that Uddālaka teaches, helped by his Ekaśruti (ability to forever remember everything that one has heard even once). Uddālaka calls Aṣṭāvakra to give him a final instruction about the Ātman, and orders him to go to the assembly of Janaka with the goal of liberating his father. Uddālaka decides to send the now-repentant Śvetaketu with Aṣṭāvakra, even though the former had insulted the latter in the past. Aṣṭāvakra determines that this task will be his Gurudakṣiṇā, and bows down to Uddālaka. Uddālaka blesses him to be victorious, and so does Sujātā. Aṣṭāvakra undertakes the ambitious journey to Mithilā, along with his uncle Śvetaketu.
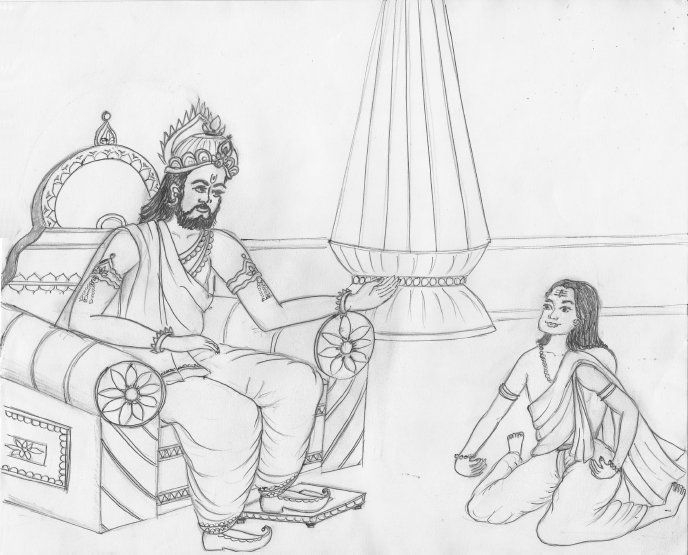
  Janaka debating with Ashtavakra.
7. Sambhāvanā (Hindi: सम्भावना, meaning Competency): Sambhāvanā or competency is vividly described in the first ten verses of the canto. Aṣṭāvakra is brimming with confidence as he approaches Mithilā. Mithilā is replete with scholars versed in the Vedas and all the six Āstika schools. The twelve-year-olds Aṣṭāvakra and Śvetaketu run into Janaka, who is on his way to the court. Janaka asks his guards to get the handicapped boy out of his way. Aṣṭāvakra responds by saying that Janaka should get out of his way instead, as he (Aṣṭāvakra) is a Brāhmaṇa versed in the scriptures. Pleased with his brilliance, Janaka tells Aṣṭāvakra that he is free to roam anywhere in Mithilā. However, Janaka's gatekeeper does not let Aṣṭāvakra into the court, and tells him that only the learned and wise elders deserve to be in Janaka's court. Aṣṭāvakra makes the gatekeeper speechless by his definition of elders – only those grown in knowledge are the elders. The gatekeeper now lets him into an assembly consisting of sages like Yājñavalkya, Gārgī and Maitreyī. Aṣṭāvakra openly challenges Bandī for a scriptural debate. Janaka asks Aṣṭāvakra to satisfy him first in debate, and poses him six cryptic questions, which Aṣṭāvakra answers convincingly. Janaka offers him Bandī, who knows within himself he will lose to Aṣṭāvakra, but decides to openly debate. Bandī mocks Aṣṭāvakra's deformities and the assembly laughs. Aṣṭāvakra chides both Bandī and the assembly and declares his intention to leave the assembly.
8. Samādhāna (Hindi: समाधान, meaning Reconciliation): The poet states that Samādhāna is the end goal of each poetic creation, and expounds on this concept, using the Rāmāyaṇa as a timeless metaphor. Janaka apologises to Aṣṭāvakra for Bandī's insult and Aṣṭāvakra calms down. He again challenges Bandī to a verbal duel, requesting Janaka to be the neutral arbiter. Aṣṭāvakra says that he will let Bandī begin the debate and will answer to Bandī's points. The debate begins in extemporaneous verses. Bandī and Aṣṭāvakra alternately compose verses on the numbers one to twelve. Bandī can then only compose the first half of a verse on the number thirteen. Aṣṭāvakra completes the verse and thus defeats Bandī. He is acclaimed by the assembly and Janaka accepts him as his preceptor. Bandī reveals that he is the son of Varuṇa and has submerged Kahola along with several other Brāhmaṇas in water to help his father carry out the twelve-year Varuṇa sacrifice. Bandī accepts his defeat and surrenders to Aṣṭāvakra. The old sage Yājñavalkya also bows down to Aṣṭāvakra and accepts the boy as his Guru. Bandī goes back to the ocean whence Kahola returns. Kahola tells his son that he would be ever indebted to him for redeeming his father. Aṣṭāvakra requests Kahola to return to the waiting Sujātā. On their way back home, Kahola asks Aṣṭāvakra to bathe in the river Samaṅgā, which is the daughter of Gaṅgā. Aṣṭāvakra's deformities are cured on bathing in the river. Sujātā is elated on seeing her husband and her no-longer handicapped son. Aṣṭāvakra stays a lifelong Brahmacārin and becomes a great Ṛṣi. At the end of the epic, Aṣṭāvakra goes to the court of Sītā and Rāma in Ayodhyā, after the battle of Rāmāyaṇa. Aṣṭāvakra is elated on seeing the queen and the king. Sītā bows down to the Guru of her father and Aṣṭāvakra blesses her.

== Themes ==
=== Revolutionism ===
The poet states that the genre of his poetry is Revolutionism (Krāntivāda). In the second canto, the poet defines the true revolution as one caused by change in thoughts. Aṣṭāvakra, while speaking to Kahola, says that Oṃ Śāntiḥ (Hail Peace!) is the old proclamation, the new one should be Oṃ Krāntiḥ (Hail Revolution!). On lines of the Oṃ Śāntiḥ Mantra, the new Mantra is to call for revolution everywhere –

Devanagari
द्यौः क्रान्तिः नभः क्रान्तिः भाग्यभूमाभूमि क्रान्तिः ।
परमपावन आपः क्रान्तिः ओषधिः सङ्क्रान्तिमय हो ॥
नववनस्पतिवृन्द क्रान्तिः विश्वदेवस्पन्द क्रान्तिः ।
महाकाव्यच्छन्द क्रान्तिः ब्रह्मभव सङ्क्रान्तिमय हो ॥

IAST
dyauḥ krāntiḥ nabhaḥ krāntiḥ bhāgyabhūmābhūmi krāntiḥ ।
paramapāvana āpaḥ krāntiḥ oṣadhiḥ saṅkrāntimaya ho ॥
navavanaspativṛnda krāntiḥ viśvadevaspanda krāntiḥ ।
mahākāvyacchanda krāntiḥ brahmabhava saṅkrāntimaya ho ॥

Revolution in the heavens; revolution in the skies; revolution on the earth, abundant with fortune; revolution in the supremely pure waters; and may there be complete revolution in the medicinal herbs. Revolution in the groups of plants; revolution in the activity of all deities; revolution in the verses of the epic; and may there be complete revolution in the entire world, born out of the Brahman. ॥ 2.80.2–2.80.3 ॥

=== Meaning of Aṣṭāvakra ===
In the epic, the poet derives the name Aṣṭāvakra as the Sandhi of Aṣṭa meaning eight and Avakra meaning not deformed or straight. In the verses 1.98 to 1.100, five interpretations are given for the word Aṣṭāvakra using this Sandhi decomposition.

1. He in whom the eight Prakṛtis – the five elements (earth, air, fire, water and space), the mind, the intellect and the ego – will never be deformed
2. He whom the eight Bhogas (sources of sensual pleasure) and the eight Maithunas (types of marriages and unions) will not be able to deform
3. He whom even the eight Lokapālas (world protectors) – Indra, Agni, Yama, Sūrya, Varuṇa, Vāyu, Kubera and Candra – will not be able to deform
4. He for whom the eight Vasus will never be unfavourable (Avakra)
5. He whose unblemished (Avakra) fame will be sung by eight Nāgas in all the eight Yāmas (three-hour periods) of the day

=== Philosophy ===
Verses dealing with philosophy are found at several places in the epic. The soliloquy by Aṣṭāvakra in the third canto includes verses on the nature of the Self (3.61–3.82), according to the Viśiṣṭādvaita school of Vedānta. A part of the instruction by Uddālaka to Aṣṭāvakra in the sixth canto (6.56–6.60) has the same subject. The phraseology used in some of these verses is the same as that used in the Vedas, the Upaniṣads and the Bhagavad Gītā. A metaphor used in the explanation of Sādhanā (6.4–6.5) combines all the six Āstika schools of Hindu philosophy – Sāṅkhya, Yoga, Vaiśeṣika, Nyāya, Mimāṃsā and Vedānta. In the seventh canto, when Aṣṭāvakra enters Mithilā, he finds scholars of all the six schools (7.27–7.28). The various sub-schools of the Vedānta are also referred to, along with the seventh school of Bhakti. The verse 8.4 mentions the differing opinions about the worldly creation in the Hindu philosophy – some say it is made of Śabda, while some say it is either Pariṇāma or Vivarta. The poet agrees with the former (Pariṇāma) view.

== Social messages ==
In various contexts of the epic, several contemporary social issues relevant to India and the world are raised. The issues are brought up in soliloquies by or dialogues between the characters in the epic. These include bias against the girl child, reservation and merit, and the state of the disabled, among others.

=== Bias against the girl child ===
The girl child has been historically discriminated against in the Indian society, due to several cultural and economic factors. The preference for sons and discrimination against the female child continues to date, reflected in statistics like child sex ratio (skewed by female infanticide and sex-selective abortions), and lower literacy rates for women. The poet raises the issue of gender inequality in the first (1.12, 1.57–1.59) and the fifth (5.17) cantos of the epic. The following verse is from the first canto in the context of the dialogue between Uddālaka and Kahola, where Uddālaka tells Kahola about the birth of Sujātā. Says Uddālaka –

Devanagari
कन्या नहीं भार है शिरका यही सृष्टि का है श्रृंगार
मानवता का यही मन्त्र है यही प्रकृति का है उपहार ।
कोख पवित्र सुता से होती पुत्री से गृह होता शुद्ध
नहीं भ्रूणहत्या विधेय है श्रुतिविरुद्ध यह कृत्य अशुद्ध ॥

IAST
kanyā nahīṃ bhāra hai śirakā yahī sṛṣṭi kā hai śrṛṃgāra
mānavatā kā yahī mantra hai yahī prakṛti kā hai upahāra ।
kokha pavitra sutā se hotī putrī se gṛha hotā śuddha
nahīṃ bhrūṇahatyā vidheya hai śrutiviruddha yaha kṛtya aśuddha ॥

The girl is not a burden on the [father's] head, instead she is ornament of creation. She is the Mantra of humanity and a gift of nature. The womb is purified by the daughter, and the home is cleansed by her. Foeticide is not to be done, it is a vile act against the [tenets of] the Vedas. ॥ 1.58 ॥

=== Reservations ===
Reservation in the educational institutes, public sector and its proposal for private sector is a controversial and much debated issue in India. Different caste and religious groups have demanded reservations in educational institutes and/or public sector in recent times, which has often led to unrest, protests, and conflicts between judiciary and legislature. In the fifth canto of the epic, while speaking to himself when comparing the learning abilities of Aṣṭāvakra (who is disabled) with those of Śvetaketu and other disciples, Uddālaka says –

Devanagari
प्रातिभ क्षेत्र में आरक्षण
न कदापि राष्ट्रहित में समुचित ।
यह घोर निरादर प्रतिभा का
अवनति का पथ अतिशय अनुचित ॥

IAST
prātibha kṣetra meṃ ārakṣaṇa
na kadāpi rāṣṭrahita meṃ samucita ।
yaha ghora nirādara pratibhā kā
avanati kā patha atiśaya anucita ॥

In the field of knowledge, reservation is never suitable for the benefit of the nation. It is blatant disrespect for talent, is extremely inappropriate and is the path to downfall. ॥ 5.40 ॥

=== Bias against the disabled ===
The epic raises several social issues concerning the four types of disabled people, and explores their states of mind as well.

The issue of prejudice and discrimination against the disabled is raised in multiple contexts. In the dialogue between Uddālaka and Kahola in the first canto, Uddālaka says that with the success of Aṣṭāvakra, the disabled will no longer be deprived of their rights by the society. They will not be pushovers any more, no more be regarded as bad omens in auspicious rituals, and would be treated with equality. In the fourth canto, while speaking to Sujāta, Uddālaka says – the notion that the disabled are a burden on family and not worthy of attention will decay the world. He cautions against insulting and humiliating the disabled, and advises treating them with respect, else even the tears of the disabled will trample one in turn. In the seventh canto, in Aṣṭāvakra's soliloquy, the poet says that making fun of the disabled is never appropriate, for they are created by the same craftsman as the entire creation. An example verse is –

Devanagari
भार है विकलांग क्या परिवार का
क्या उपेक्ष्या पात्र वह सकलांग का ।
जगत को जर्जरित कर देगी झटिति
यह विषम अवधारणा कुसमाज की ॥

IAST
bhāra hai vikalāṃga kyā parivāra kā
kyā upekṣyā pātra vaha sakalāṃga kā ।
jagata ko jarjarita kara degī jhaṭiti
yaha viṣama avadhāraṇā kusamāja kī ॥

Is the disabled [child] a burden on the family? Is the disabled worthy of neglect by others? Such unequal assessment of the mistaken society will result in the decay of the whole world. ॥ 5.63 ॥

== Poetic features ==
=== Rasas ===
The principle Rasas in the epic are the Vīra (heroism or bravery) and the Karuṇa (compassion) Rasas. Aṣṭāvakra's soliloquy after his father's curse (third canto), Kahola's repentance of the curse (fourth canto) and the conversation between Uddālaka's and Sujātā after Kahola's drowning in water are contexts with compassion and pathos. Aṣṭāvakra's determination and resolve to liberate is father (fifth canto) and his journey to Mithilā (sixth canto) are the notable contexts with the emotion of heroism.

=== Figures of Speech ===
==== Anuprāsa (Alliteration) and Yamaka ====
Yamaka is a kind of pun in Saṃskṛta (and also in Hindi and other Prākṛta languages) where a word occurs multiple times and each occurrence has a different meaning. An example of alliteration (Anuprāsa) mixed with Yamaka from the epic is the second half of the verse 7.32 –

Devanagari
अङ्ग अङ्ग पर विलस रहे थे ललितललाम विभूषण
भवभूषण दूषणरिपुदूषणदूषण निमिकुलभूषण ।

IAST
aṅga aṅga para vilasa rahe the lalitalalāma vibhūṣaṇa
bhavabhūṣaṇa dūṣaṇaripudūṣaṇa dūṣaṇa nimikulabhūṣaṇa ।

The best charming ornaments glittered on each limb [of Janaka]. He was the adornment of the world, the remover of all arguments against the enemy of Dūṣaṇa (Rāma), and crest jewel of the clan of Nimi. ॥ 7.32 ॥

In the second half of verse the 1.21, the poet uses the words raurava and gaurava in the same line four and three times respectively, with a different meaning in each occurrence.

Devanagari
रौरवसहित रहित रौरव से रौरवकृत जितरौरव थे
गौरवमय अभिमान विवर्जित श्रितगौरव हितगौरव थे ॥

IAST
rauravasahita rahita raurava se rauravakṛta jitaraurava the
gauravamaya abhimāna vivarjita śritagaurava hitagaurava the ॥

He (Kahola) had [a garment of] the skin of the Ruru antelope (Antelope picta), he was without dishonesty, he was the composer of hymns, and he was the conqueror of the hell named Raurava. He was full of self-respect, without pride, in the refuge of the Guru, and the holder of veneration [by others]. ॥ 1.21 ॥

==== Bhaṣāsamaka ====
At several places in the epic (1.85, 4.100, 8.106 and 8.108), the poet uses the Bhāṣāsamaka (also known as Maṇipravāla) figure of speech, where Saṃskṛta and Hindi are blended together. An example is this verse in which the etymology of the name Sujātā is explained using Nirukta.

Devanagari
सुभगो जातो यस्याः सैव सुजाता नाम निरुक्ति यही
अष्टावक्र सुभग जातक की बनी सुजाता मातु सही ॥

IAST
subhago jāto yasyāḥ saiva sujātā nāma nirukti yahī
aṣṭāvakra subhaga jātaka kī banī sujātā mātu sahī ॥

The etymological interpretation of Sujātā is one whose son is fortunate. Verily, Sujātā became the mother of the blessed son Aṣṭāvakra ॥ 1.85 ॥

==== Mudrā ====
In the Mudrā figure of speech, the metre used to compose the verse is indicated by the use of its name in the verse. The last verse of the third canto in Aṣṭāvakra is composed in the Śārdūlavikrīḍita metre (a metre commonly used in Saṃskṛta epics), and also contains the word śārdūlavikrīḍitam.

Devanagari
अष्टावक्र महर्षि वाक्य कह रहे ज्यों हो रहे मौन थे
त्यों ही बिप्र कहोल के नयन भी नीरन्ध्रवर्षी बने ।
सीमन्तोन्नयनीय वेदविधि भी सम्पन्न प्रायः हुई
गाएँ देव सभी कहोलसुत का शार्दूलविक्रीडितम् ॥

IAST
aṣṭāvakra maharṣi vākya kaha rahe jyoṃ ho rahe mauna the
tyoṃ hī bipra kahola ke nayana bhī nīrandhravarṣī bane ।
sīmantonnayanīya vedavidhi bhī sampanna prāyaḥ huī
gāeँ deva sabhī kaholasuta kā śārdūlavikrīḍitam ॥

As the great sage Aṣṭāvakra became silent on uttering these words, tears began to flow uninterrupted from the eyes of the Brāhmaṇa Kahola. The ceremony of Sīmantonnayana [of Sujātā], as prescribed by the Vedas, was also largely completed. The deities were singing the lion's sport [like act] of the son of Kahola. ॥ 3.108 ॥

In his Saṃskṛta epic Śrībhārgavarāghavīyam, the poet Rāmabhadrācārya has used this figure of speech at eight places.

=== The debates in Mithilā ===
Four conversations are described in the seventh and eighth cantos of the epic. These include the first conversation between Aṣṭāvakra and Janaka, followed by the three debates of Aṣṭāvakra – the first one to convince the gatekeeper to let him into the assembly; then his answers to the cryptic questions of Janaka; and finally the Śāstrārtha between Bandī and Aṣṭāvakra, in which the seemingly simple enumerations of the numbers one to thirteen belie enigmas and latent meanings which lie beneath. These conversations in the epic are the same as in the Mahābhārata, and the comparison between the poetry in the Saṃskṛta of Mahābhārata and the Hindi of Aṣṭāvakra is noteworthy.

== Critical response ==
The Readers' Forum of the Madhya Pradesh Sahitya Akademi organised a conference of reviewers in September 2010 to critique the epic in Ashoknagar. The chief reviewer, Professor S N Saxena, said that the epic is the story from struggle to success, and is a source of inspiration for the disabled, coming out of the poet's own experience. Other reviewers at the conference included writers Ram Sevak Soni, Sudhir Gupta, Subhash Jain Saral and Pradeep Manoria. The reviewers said that the epic describes the feelings and the rise of the disabled and it is very relevant in the contemporary world. The Madhya Pradesh Sahitya Akademi organised another conference of reviewers at Damoh in November 2010, where various littérateurs discussed the epic.
