= Ugrasena Janaka =

King of Videha Kingdom

Ugrasena
- Janaka
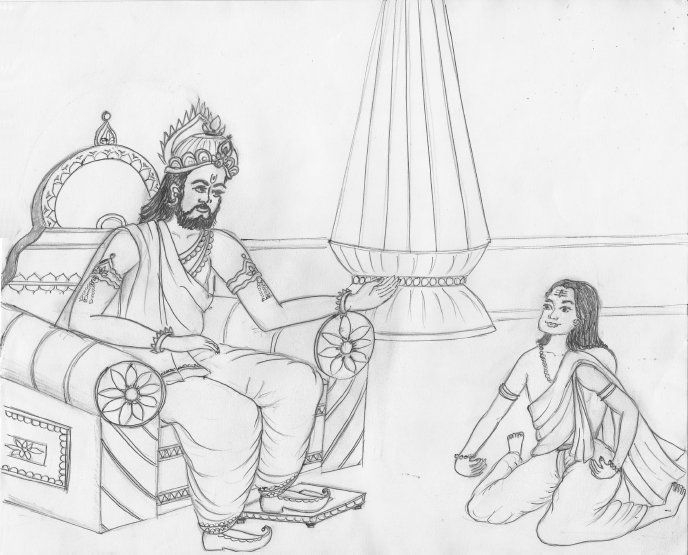
- Ramabhadracharya art Works (2010) - depicting King Janaka's discussion with the sage Ashtavakra
- Predecessor: King Puşakarni
- Successor: Kṛti Janaka
- Born: Mithila (Videha)
Names
- Ugrasena Janaka
Era name and dates
- Later Dwapara Yuga: Post-Mahabharata war
Regnal name
- Videha Raj Ugrasena Janaka
- House: Mithila
- House: Videha
- Dynasty: Janaka
- Father: Indradhumn
- Religion: Hinduism
- Occupation: Samrāṭ (emperor); Philosopher King

Ugrasena Janaka was a king of the ancient Videha Kingdom located in the Indian subcontinent. He belonged to the Janaka dynasty in Mithila. He was contemporary to Satanika, the son of Kuru King Janamejaya. He was a great patron of Sanskrit and Vedic learning in Mithila. He patronized Vedic philosophy in his kingdom. The court of King Ugrasena Janaka was a major hub for Vedic scholars and sages in the subcontinent. Ugrasena is also known as Indradhumni or Aindradyumni. Some times in literary works, his full name is written as Janaka Ugrasena Puşkaramālin or Ugrasena Janaka Pushkaramālin Aindradyumni.

== Early life ==
Ugrasena was born in the family of Janaka dynasty in Mithila. He was the son of Indradhumn.

== Description ==
In several literary and historical documents, Ugrasena of the ancient Videha Kingdom is identified as a king of the Janaka dynasty in Mithila. According to the scholars of these documents, the debate between the two Acharyas Bandi and Kahoda took place at his court in Mithila.

Similarly, the Shastrartha between Acharya Bandi and the young Brahmin scholar Ashtavakra also took at his court during his reign. In this Shastrartha, the young Brahmin Ashtavakra had addressed the name of King Janaka as Ugrasena. He said

अत्रोग्रसेनसमितेषु राजन्समागतेष्वप्रतिमेषु राजसु । न वै विवित्सान्तरमस्ति वादिनां महाजले हंसनिनादिनामिव ॥

— Verse 1, Chapter 134, Book 3, Mahabharata

In the same debate, the acharya Bandi praised the King Janaka as the greatest king among all other kings in the subcontinent. He treated the King Ugrasena Janaka as the great legendary mountain Mainaka and all other kings as ordinary mountains. Also he treated Janaka as a bull and all other kings as calves. His statement is

सर्वे राज्ञो मैथिलस्य मैनाकस्येव पर्वताः । निकृष्टभूता राजानो वत्सा अनदुहो यथा ॥

— Verse 5, Chapter 134, Book 3, Mahabharata

In the Book 3 (Vana Parva) of the text Mahabharata, the King Ugrasena Janaka is called a Samrāṭ. The Indic term Samrāṭ means an emperor.

== Court of Ugrasena Janaka ==
At the court of the Videha King Ugrasena, the royal Acharya Bandi was the chief advisor of the king. The royal Acharya Bandi was a wise Vedic scholar. He defeated several scholars in the Shastrarthas held at the court of Ugrasena. He instituted a punishment system known as Jal Samadhi for the defeated scholars in the Shastrarthas. In a specific Shastrartha, he defeated other eminent Vedic scholar Acharya Kahoda at the court and maintained his dominance at the court.

Later, when Ashtavakra (the son of Kahoda) became 10 years, he challenged Acharya Bandi for Shastrartha at the court. In this Shastrartha, the acharya Bandi was defeated by the young Brahmin Ashtavakra. After that Ashtavakra was appointed as the chief advisor of the King Ugrasena Janaka in Mithila. He taught the philosophy of self to the King Ugrasena Janaka. The philosophical discourse between the sage Ashtavakra and the King Ugrasena Janaka is recorded as the philosophical text Ashtavakra Geeta.

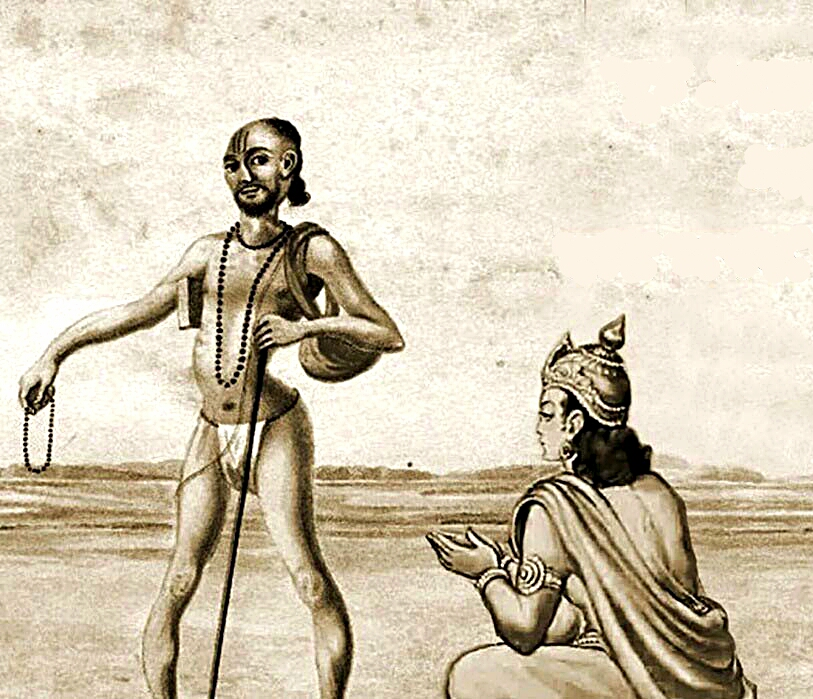
Image depicting the philosophical discourse between the sage Ashtavakra and the King Ugrasena Janaka in Mithila.

== Family life ==
According to the Pargiter's scheme, the daughter of the King Ugrasena Janaka was probably married to the prince Shatanika, the son of Janamejaya.
