= Vandin =

Acharya at Ancient Mithila University

Acharya Vandin
- वंदी/बंदी

Personal life
- Home town: Videha
- Parent: Lord Varuna (father)
- Region: Mithila region
- Education: Ancient Mithila University
- Known for: Institution of the punishment called as "Jala Samadhi" for the defeated scholars in the Shastrarthas; Shastrartha with Acharya Kahoda; Shastrartha with Ashtavakra
- Other names: Bandi and Vandi

Religious life
- Religion: Hinduism
- Royal Acharya at the court of King Janaka in Mithila Kingdom

Vandin was a royal Acharya at court of King Janaka in the Mithila Kingdom. Some documents write his name as Vandi or Bandi. He was a wise pundit, who defeated many Vedic scholars in Shastrarthas held at the court of the King Janaka in Mithila. But later he was also defeated by the great Indian philosopher Ashtavakra. During his period, the king in the Kingdom of Videha (Mithila) was Ugrasena Janaka.

== Etymology ==
Vandin is a Sanskrit term having meanings "one who praises or honors" and an encomiast or a bard, etc. Similar there are more meanings like a panegyrist or a flatterer.

== Early life ==
According to legend, Acharya Bandi is believed to be the son of Lord Varuna. In the tradition of Hinduism, Lord Varuna is believed to be the Devata of water (Jala).

== Description ==
In the text Mahabharata, Acharya Vandin is introduced at the chapter 132 in the Book 3 called as Vana Parva. In this chapter, the sage Lomasa narrated the legend of Ashtavakra and Acharya Vandin to the Pandavas while they were exiled from their Kingdom.
