= Ashtavakra Mandir =

Hindu temple related to the Indian philosopher Ashtavakra

- अष्टावक्र मंदिर

Religion
- Affiliation: Hinduism
- District: Bhagalpur district
- Deity: Ashtavakra
- Governing body: Shree Ashtavakra Tirth Seva Nyas Trust

Location
- Location: Kahalgaon, Bhagalpur
- State: Bihar

Architecture
- Type: Hinduism
- Founder: Rambhadracharya
- Completed: 2023

Ashtavakra Mandir is the Hindu temple built in the memory of the Indian philosopher Ashtavakra at the bank of the holy river Ganga near Kahalgaon, Bihar. The temple was inaugurated by Padmavibhushan Swami Rambhadracharya. The temple is located at Charon Dham Ghat of Uttar Vahini Ganga Ghat in Kahalgaon of Bhagalpur district. Kahalgaon is believed as the birthplace of the Indian philosopher Ashtavakra. It is the first temple devoted to Ashtavakra.

== Description ==
The idea of the construction of Ashtavakra Mandir at the birth land of the great sage Ashtavakra was proposed by Rambhadracharya on 25 April 2022. The construction of the temple is completed in the period of one year. Shree Ashtavakra Tirth Seva Nyas Trust having 11 trustee takes care of the pilgrimage. A statue of the sage Ashtavakra is installed in the temple. Tulsi Peeth of Chitrakoot will pay expenditure of typing Ashtavakra Gita on the temple. A separate temple of Ashtavakra in the lap of his parents and Rama - Sita with folded hands in front of Ashtavakra will also be built in the same campus of the Ashtavakra Mandir. The construction of this temple will be completed in 2026.
