= Ashtavakra =

Ancient sage in Hinduism

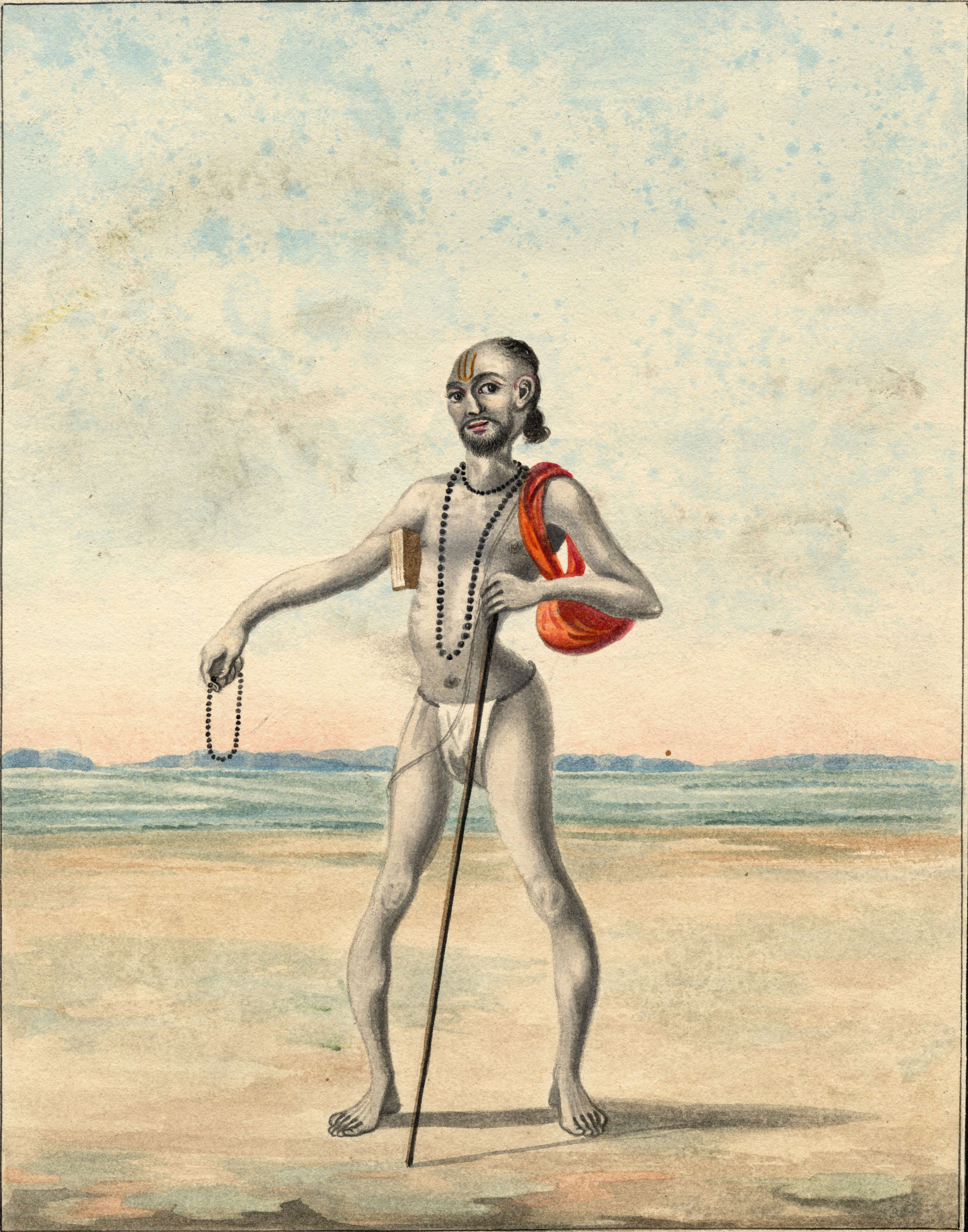
- 19th-century painting depicting Ashtavakra

Personal life
- Born: Videha
- Spouse: Suprabha
- Parents: Kahoda (father); Sujata (mother)
- Region: Mithila region
- Education: Uddalaka Aruni Ashram Ancient Mithila University
- Known for: Ashtavakra - Acharya Bandi Shastrarth
- Occupation: Professor; Philosopher

Religious life
- Religion: Hinduism
- Institute: Uddalaka Aruni Ashram

Religious career
- Teacher: Uddalaka Aruni

Ashtavakra (Sanskrit: अष्टावक्रः, lit. 'eight deformities', IAST: Aṣṭāvakraḥ) is a revered Vedic sage in Hinduism. His maternal grandfather was the Vedic sage Aruni, his parents were both Vedic students at Aruni's school. Ashtavakra studied, became a sage and a celebrated character of the Hindu Itihasa epics and Puranas.

Ashtavakra is the author of the text Aṣṭāvakra Gītā, also known as Aṣṭāvakra Saṃhitā, in Hindu traditions. The text is a treatise on Brahman and Ātman.

== History ==
Little is known about the life or century in which Ashtavakra actually lived, except for the accounts found in the major Indian chronicle (the Ramayana and the Mahabharata) and the Puranas. The legends state that sage Aruni, mentioned in the Chāndogya Upaniṣad, ran an ashram teaching the Vedas. Kahoḍa was one of his students, along with Aruni's daughter Sujata. Aruni's daughter married Kahoḍa. She got pregnant, and during her pregnancy, the developing baby heard the chanting of the Vedas and learnt the correct recitation. According to one version of the legends surrounding Ashtavakra, his father was once reciting the Vedas, but erred in correct intonation. The fetus spoke from the womb and corrected him. The father got angry and cursed him to be born crooked. Thus the child was born with eight (ashta) deformities (vakra), hence the name 'Ashtavakra'.

His father, Kahoda, once went to ask for wealth from Janaka, the ancient king of Videha, because his family was poor. There he was defeated in a debate by Vandin, and as a consequence was drowned in water. Hearing of the fate of her husband, Sujata kept it secret from her child. When Ashtavakra grew up, he learned about his curse and his father's fate. He then asked his mother to accompany him to witness the great sacrifice of King Janaka. He was stopped from entering the king's sacrificial assembly as only learned Brahmans and kings were allowed to enter, and he was only ten years old. His eloquence and knowledge impressed the king, who allowed him to enter. There, he challenged Vandin to a debate. After a heated debate, he defeated Vandin with his knowledge. He then asked the king, to subject Vandin to the same fate that Vandin had inflicted on the Brahmans by drowning them into the water. Vandin then revealed that he was the son of Varun, and explained that he drowned those Brahmans as a part of a ritual that his father was performing for twelve years, which required a large number of Brahmans. By then, the ritual had been completed and all the Brahmans he had submerged, including Ashtavakra's father Kahoda, were freed. Kahoda was very impressed with his son, Ashtavakra, and while going back home, asked him to take a dip in the River Samanga. When Ashtavakra came out of the river, all of his deformities had been cured.

== Attributed texts ==
Ashtavakra is credited as the author of the Ashtavakra Gita (IAST: Ashtavakra Gītā), which means "song of Ashtavakra". The text is also known as Ashtavakra Saṃhitā. The Ashtavakra Gita examines the metaphysical nature of existence and the meaning of individual freedom, presenting its thesis that there is only one Supreme Reality (Brahman). It presents that the entirety of universe is one and manifestation of this reality, that everything is interconnected, all Self (Atman/soul) are part of that one, and that individual freedom is not the end point but an innate starting point.

If you wish to be free,
Know you are the Self,
The witness of all these,
The heart of awareness.
Set your body aside.
Sit in your own awareness.
You will at once be happy,
Forever still, Forever free.
(...)
You are everywhere,
Forever free.
If you think you are free, You are free.
If you think you are bound, You are bound.
Meditate on the Self.
One without two,
Exalted awareness.

— Ashtavakra Gita 1.4–14, Translator: Thomas Byrom

According to American scholar Jessica Wilson, the Sanskrit poetics in Ashtavakra Gita are not driven by critical syllogism, but are rich in philosophical premises and spiritual effectiveness. Wilson attributes the texts resonant narrative to "textual indeterminacy between the audience's disposition and the foregrounded theme of non-individuation in the text. This tension... results in consistency building by the audience, which enables the transcendence of these two viewpoints (reader and text)".

== Literature ==
=== Ramayana ===
Ashtavakra is referenced in verse 6.119.17 of Yuddha Kāṇḍa in Vālmikī's Rāmāyaṇa. When Daśaratha comes to see Rāma from heaven after the war of the Rāmāyaṇa, he tells Rāma –

O son! I have been conveyed across (redeemed) by you, who a deserving son and a great being; like the virtuous Brahmana Kahoḍa [was redeemed] by [his son] Aṣṭāvakra. ॥ 6.119.17 ॥

In the Aranya Kanda of Adhyatma Ramayana, the demon Kabandha narrates his story to Rama and Lakshmana, stating that he was a Gandharva earlier who was cursed by Ashtavakra to become a demon as he had laughed on seeing him (Ashtavakra). When the Gandharva bowed down to Ashtavakra, Ashtavakra said that he would be released from the curse by Rama in Treta Yuga.

=== Mahābhārata ===
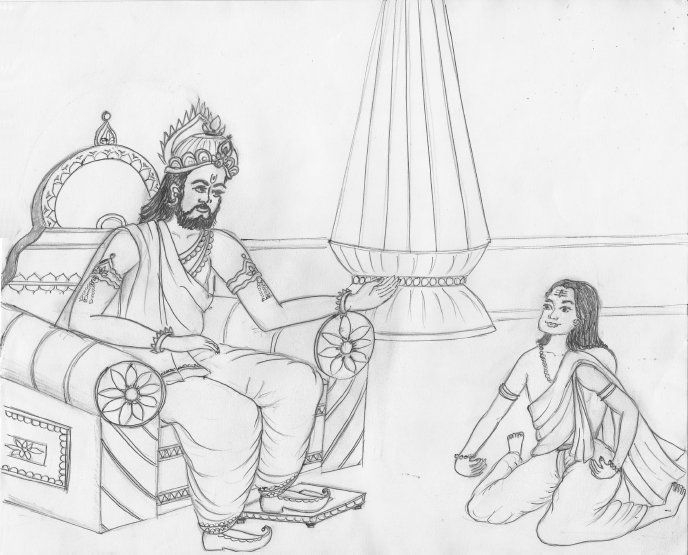
Janaka debating with Ashtavakra. Art from the epic Ashtavakra (2010).

In the Vana Parva of the Mahābhārata, the legend of Ashtavakra is described in greater detail. On losing the game of dice with the Kauravas, the five Pāṇḍava princes and Draupadi were exiled for twelve years. On their pilgrimage, they met the sage Lomaśa, and he narrated to the Pāṇḍava princes the legend of Ashtavakra, over three chapters of Vana Parva of the Mahābhārata. Ashtavakra's wisdom on various aspects of human existence is recited in the Mahābhārata. For example:

A grey head does not make an elder,
Not by years, not by grey hairs, not by riches nor by relations did the seers make the Law,
He who is great to us, is one who has learning.

— Ashtavakra, Vana Parva, Mahabharata Book iii

=== Puranas ===
Ashtavakra and Śvetaketu made their way to Janaka's palace. Ashtavakra first encountered the gatekeeper who tried to keep the young boy out. After convincing the gatekeeper that he was well versed in the scriptures and hence old, he was admitted. Janaka then tested Ashtavakra with cryptic questions which Ashtavakra answered with ease. Janaka decided to let Ashtavakra face Vandin. Vandin and Ashtavakra began the debate, with Vandin starting. They alternately composed six extempore verses on the numbers one to twelve. When they reached number thirteen, Vandin could only compose the first half of a verse. Ashtavakra completed the verse by composing the second half and thus won the debate against Vandin. Their debate uses enigmas and implied meanings based on the numbers one to thirteen.

== In arts ==
- Ashtavakra is one of the characters in the First Act of the Sanskrit play Uttara-Rāmacaritam composed by Bhavabhuti in the 8th century.
- The 571st volume of the Amar Chitra Katha, first published in 1976, is titled Dhruva and Ashtavakra. The second half of the volume presents the narrative of Ashtavakra.
- A puppet play on Ashtavakra was staged by the Dhaatu Artist group in Ranga Shankara in Bangalore in 2010.
- Ashtavakra Gita became very popular after Indian Spiritual leader Sri Sri Ravi Shankar gave a commentary in Bangalore in 1991.

== See also ==
- Agastya
- Ashtavakra Gita
- Ancient Mithila University
- Trivakra, a legendary hunchbacked woman, who was deformed at three places.
- Ugrasena Janaka
