= Kubja =

Hunchbacked woman in Hindu mythology

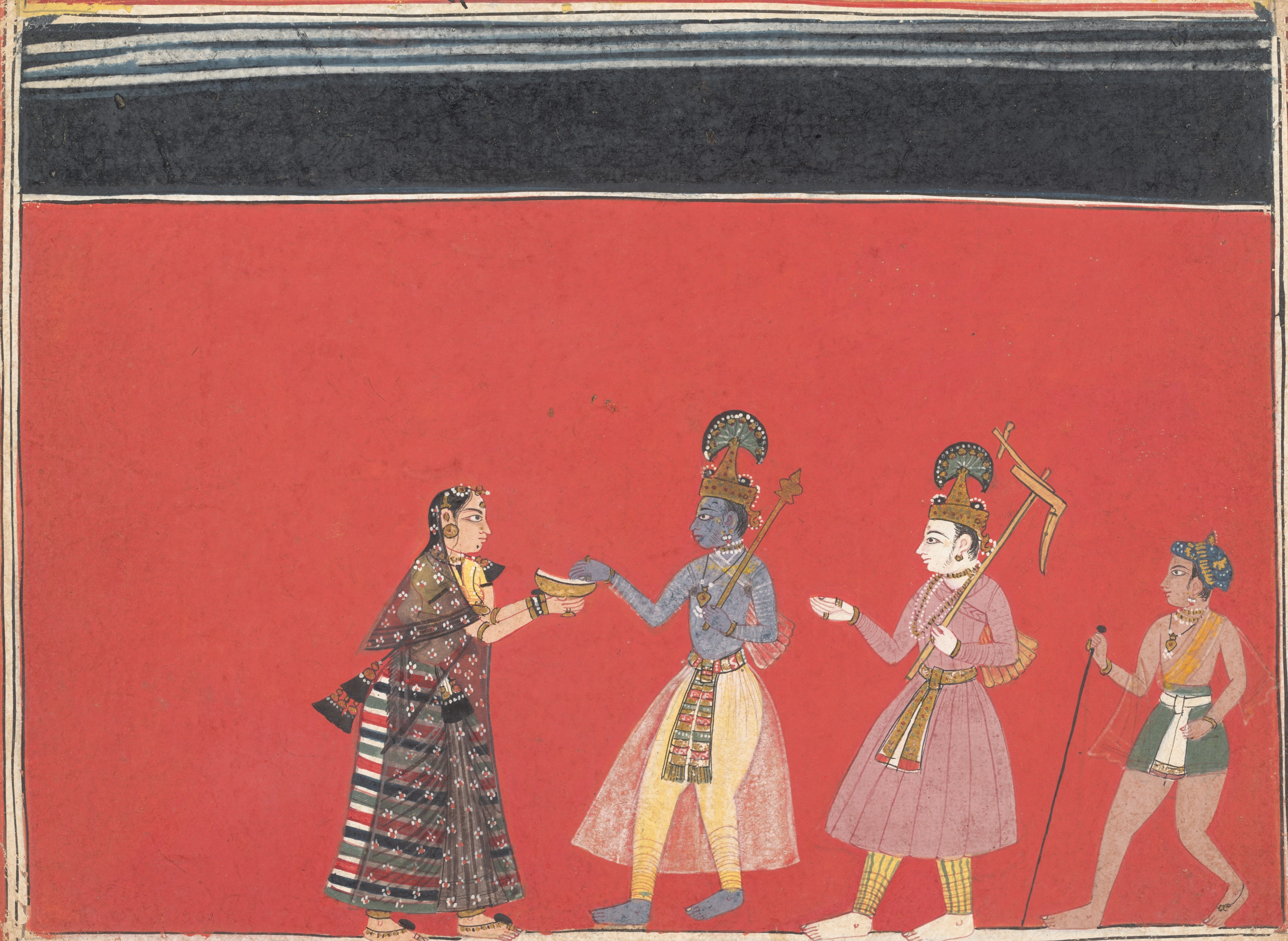
- Krishna accepts an offering from the hunchbacked woman, Trivakra (Kubja)
- Devanagari: कुब्जा
- Affiliation: Trivakra
- Abode: Goloka
- Texts: Brahmavaivarta Purana, Bhagavata Purana, Sur Sagar
- Consort: Krishna (spiritual)

Kubja is a legendary hunchbacked woman from Mathura, who the Hindu god Krishna is described to have rescued and made beautiful.

The episode is described in the Bhagavata Purana, Brahmavaivarta Purana and the Sur sagar by Surdas.

== Background ==
The Bhagavata Purana narrates that after meeting his friend Sudama, Krishna and his elder brother Balarama walked through the streets of Mathura and encountered Kubja, a young hunchback maidservant of king Kamsa. She had a beautiful face and carried a plate of ointment. Krishna praises her beauty and asks for ointment in return for a boon. She introduces herself as Trivakra, one who is bent in three places.

Mesmerized by Krishna's charm, she grants him the ointment that she was taking to the king. Pleased, Krishna presses his toes on her feet and places a finger from both his hands under her chin, and raises the fingers. This straightened her body. Kubja is overcome with desire for her saviour, pulls the upper garment. However, Krishna politely declines and promises to return to her after fulfilling the purpose of his visit.

Surdas's poetry mentions the episode in a passing reference, however the focus in that text is the saving grace of God, who does not discriminate in devotees and helps even a low class maidservant. After slaying Kamsa, Krishna visits Kubja with Uddhava as promised. Kubja worships Krishna with her companions and offers him a seat of honour. As Kubja readies herself for Krishna, Krishna made himself comfortable in Kubja's bed in the inner chambers. By embracing him, Kubja's desire is fulfilled. She requests Krishna to stay with her, however Krishna left for Uddhava's residence, promising he will fulfil her desires again.

Surdas talks about the second meeting of Kubja and Krishna in more detail. He mentions that Kubja's fortune is due to her virtue in a previous life. After killing Kamsa, Krishna hurries to Kubja's house to fulfil her desire.

In the Brahma Vaivarta Purana, Kubja is the reincarnation of Shurpanakha, a demoness who vied for Rama, Krishna's previous birth on earth. Surpanaka's penance is rewarded in her birth as Kubja, when her desire to unite with Rama is fulfilled. Hence she receives Krishna (reincarnation of Rama) as husband (spiritually). After the union with Krishna she received Goloka and became a cowherdess named Candramukhi.

Classical works like the Vishnu Purana do not record the visit of Krishna to Kubja's house.

== In popular culture ==
The story of Kubja appears in the beginning and the end of the 2019 film Bala, in the form of a school play. The reference is made in relation to an underlying theme of colorism in the film.

== See also ==
- Ashtavakra, a Vedic sage in Hinduism, who was deformed at eight places.
