= Uddālaka Āruṇi =

Vedic sage

Personal life
- Born: Kuru-Panchala, India
- Children: Svetaketu
- Main interests: Metaphysics; Science
- Notable ideas: Theory of three elements; Atman-Brahman Doctrine

Religious life
- Religion: Hinduism

Religious career
- Disciples: Yajnavalkya, Janaka, Kahoda

Uddalaka Aruni (fl. c. 8th century BCE), (Devanagari: उद्दालक आरुणि) also referred to as Uddalaka or Aruni or Uddalaka Varuni, was a revered Vedic sage of Hinduism. He is mentioned in many Vedic era Sanskrit texts, and his philosophical teachings are among the centerpiece in the Brihadaranyaka Upanishad and Chandogya Upanishad, two of the oldest Upanishadic scriptures. A famed Vedic teacher, Aruni lived a few centuries before the Buddha, and attracted students from far regions of the Indian subcontinent; some of his students such as Yajnavalkya are also highly revered in the Hindu traditions. Both Aruni and Yajnavalkya are among the most frequently mentioned Upanishadic teachers in Hinduism.

According to Ben-Ami Scharfstein, a professor emeritus of Philosophy at Tel Aviv University, Uddalaka Aruni was one of the first philosophers in recorded history. Debiprasad Chattopadhyaya established Uddalaka Aruni as the first 'natural scientist' in the intellectual history of the world. In the Chandogya Upanishad, Aruni asks metaphysical questions concerning the nature of reality and truth, observes constant change, and asks if there is something eternal and unchanging. From these questions, embedded in a dialogue with his son, he presents the concept of Ātman (soul, Self) and Brahman (universal Self).

== Life ==
Uddālaka Āruṇi was a Brahmin of the Gautama lineage who was from Kuru-Pañcāla. He was the pupil of Aruṇa (his father) and Patañcala Kāpya. He was the preceptor of Yājñavalkya Vājasaneya, Kahola Kauṣītaki, Proti Kausurubindi, and his own son Śvetaketu Auddālaki. He defeated Prācīnayogya Śauceya and likely Bhadrasena Ājātaśatrava in debate, but was defeated in the debate of Bahudakshina Yajna held at the court of King Janaka in Mithila, by his own pupil Yājñavalkya.

== History ==
The name Aruni appears in many of the Principal Upanishads, in numerous verses. For example:

- In sections 3.7 and 6.2 of the Brihadaranyaka Upanishad, in a dialogue where Aruni is relatively a minor participant.
- In sections 6.1–16 and 5.3 of the Chandogya Upanishad, as a major dialogue between Aruni and his son Svetaketu, a dialogue about Atman and Brahman that contain ideas foundational to the Vedanta school of Hindu philosophy. The dialogue sets the context of the son, who goes to a Vedic school for twelve years of studies, is conceded that he has learnt the books (Vedas). Aruni, the father enquires and presses Svetaketu whether at school, he pondered and understood the nature of existence, what is truth, what is reality, the meaning of life and self-knowledge, and the relationship between oneself, other beings and the universal self.
- In verse 1.1 of the Kaushitaki Upanishad, where the scion of Gangya invites Aruni, but he sends his son to the event. This verse is notable for the conversation therein that suggests the full name of Aruni to be Uddalaka Aruni Gautama, and the mention of him as one of the characters in a group event that hosted "Vedic studies in the hall of sacrifice" (yajna).
- In the Katha Upanishad, which opens with the story of Vajasravasa, also called Aruni Auddalaki Gautama. According to Max Muller, assuming the manuscripts have been correctly reproduced over their history, there may be a difference between "Auddalaki" (grandson) and "Uddalaki" (son), but he adds Adi Shankara considered them to be same Aruni, in his commentaries on the Upanishads. The theme discussed in the dialogues of the Katha Upanishad is also Atman and Brahman. Paul Deussen, an Indologist at University of Kiel, states that there are inconsistencies about his full name in the Hindu traditions.

== Texts ==
Sage Aruni is revered in the Hindu tradition, and like many of its revered ancient scholars, later-era scholars from the earliest times attributed or named their texts after him. Some of these treatises include:

- Arunisruti, also called Uddalaka Sruti, likely a medieval era theistic text that has been lost to history, and one cited by Madhvacharya.
- Aruni Upanishad, also called Āruṇeyī or Āruṇika Upanishad, is a minor upanishad related to the Samaveda and is one of the oldest renunciation and monk life-related Sannyasa Upanishads of Hinduism. The text was likely completed in or after 4th-century BCE but before the start of the common era, according to Joachim Sprockhoff, the German scholar of Upanishads and according to Patrick Olivelle. The Aruni Upanishad states that bookish and ritual knowledge is irrelevant, the true pursuit of knowledge is the meaning, the essence and the import of Vedic ideas, one has the right and duty to abandon the worldly life in the singular pursuit of spirituality.

== Philosophy ==
One very important work of Debiprasad Chattopadhyaya, Science and Society in ancient India, discusses Aruni. In this book he established Uddalaka Aruni as the first "natural scientist" in the intellectual history of mankind. He wrote, "Uddalaka collected observations as far as his historical conditions permitted him and even went on diligently to make experiments to understand nature and man."

=== Theory of three elements ===
According to his theory, there are three elements that make up living things, each of which is a power. The elements are heat, water, and food (meaning plant). He believed the primal creation due to desire emanated heat/light, light having same desire emanated water from itself, then water having the same desire emanated food from itself, which according to him explains why there is plenty of food when it rains. Aruni explained that the existent entered these three elements and when it entered, it caused the elements to contain something of the other two. Fire, for example, not only contains heat but also other two elements.

=== Atman-Brahman doctrine ===
One of the most well-known teachings of Atman appears in Chandogya Upanishad as the instruction of Uddalaka Aruni to his son Svetaketu. Uddalaka begins his explanation that one can know about the universal of a material substance from a particular object made of that substance. For example, by means of something made of clay, one can know clay; by means of an ornament made of copper, one can know copper. He gives an example for Atman-Brahman doctrine: Just as bees collect nectar from different sources, but when gathered together they form an undifferentiated mass; just as different rivers after flowing into the ocean become one with the ocean, similarly Atman resides individually in every being but merges with the Brahman and becomes one with it. Uddalaka next asks his son to put some salt in a glass of water. Shvetaketu does so. Upon being asked by his father to fetch the salt, Shvetaketu could not find it as it had dissolved in the water. Next, Aruni asks his son to taste the water. Upon being found salty, Aruni preaches Shvetaketu instruction on the Ultimate Reality.

He says, 'You don't perceive that one Reality (sat) exists in your body, my son, but it is truly there. Everything which is has its being in that subtle essence. That is Reality! That is the Soul! And you are that, Shvetaketu!"

== Influence ==
Uddalaka Aruni is said to have systematized the Vedic and Upanishadic thoughts. Many Mahavakyas are ascribed to sage Uddalaka Aruni. Among those, "Tat Tvam Asi" (That thou art) of the Chandogya Upanishad is an oft-quoted thought in Hinduism. Its teacher is Uddalaka Aruni and the student his son Svetaketu.

His teachings extend beyond metaphysical speculations and philosophy. Parts of his works contain the seeds of Indian atomism, because of his belief that "particles too small to be seen mass together into the substances and objects of experience".

== In the Mahabharata ==
The Adi Parva describes Aruni as a disciple of Sage Ayoda-Dhaumya. Once a flood took place in the fields of the ashram. A breach was formed in the embankment. Dhaumya sent Aruni to stop the water from entering the embankment. After a long time, Aruni had not returned. So, Dhaumya went out to find Aruni. The latter was lying in the breach of the embankment to prevent the water from entering it. Because of his loyalty, Aruni is also known as Uddalaka Aruni as a mark of his preceptor's respect.

== See also ==
- Yajnavalkya
- Svetaketu
- Janaka of Videha
- Empedocles and Greek atomism
- Agastya
- Adi Parva
