= Śvetaketu =

Upanishadic sage

Svetaketu
- Father: Uddalaka Aruni

Svetaketu (IAST: Śvetaketu), also spelt Shvetaketu, was a sage mentioned in the Chandogya Upanishad. He was the son of the sage Uddalaka, whose real name was Aruni, and represents the pursuit of knowledge.

In the Mahabharata, Svetaketu is credited for creating the practice of the "wife being loyal to one husband for life" after observing a brahmana catching his mother's hand in front of his father. (Note: kruddham tam tu pita drstva svetaketum uvaca ha; mã tãta kopam kãrsis tvam esa dharmah sanātanah Mahabharata Book 1 Adi Parva: Section 122 (Sambhava Parva),-Pandu narrating to Kunti: "It hath been heard by us that there was a great Rishi of the name of Uddalaka, who had a son named Swetaketu who also was an ascetic of merit. O thou of eyes like lotus-petals, the present virtuous practice hath been established by that Swetaketu from anger. Hear thou the reason. One day, in the presence of Swetaketu's father a Brahmana came and catching Swetaketu's mother by the hand, told her, 'Let us go.' Beholding his mother seized by the hand and taken away apparently by force, the son was greatly moved by wrath. Seeing his son indignant, Uddalaka addressed him and said, 'Be not angry. O son! This is the practice sanctioned by antiquity")

The case of Svetaketu appears in three principal (mukhya) Upanishads, namely, the Brhadaranyaka Upanishad S. 6.2.1 to 6.2.8, Chandogya Upanishad S.5.3 and in the Kausitaki S.1. Svetaketu is the recipient of the knowledge enshrined in the mahavakya which appears in the sixteen chapters of the 6th section (Prapathaka) of the Chandogya Upanishad.

== First Reincarnation Story ==
Svetaketu's story in the Chandogya Upanishad is the first time that reincarnation is mentioned in the Vedas and perhaps in all of the known writings in human history. In the story, Svetaketu returns home from studying and his childhood friends ask him what he learned about the afterlife, to which he replies it was not part of his curriculum. They ask Svetaketu's father and he also does not know, so they ask the king, who claims to have known all along and explained the concept of reincarnation. He adds that it is a common belief among the Kshatriya (warrior and administrative class) and from this belief, they draw their power (courage in battle).
