= Kahoda =

Acharya at Ancient Mithila University

Acharya Kahoda
- कहोड

Personal life
- Home town: Kahalgaon
- Spouse: Sujata
- Region: Mithila region
- Education: Ancient Mithila University
- Other names: Kahola, Kahoḍaka, Khagodara and Kahodara

Religious life
- Religion: Hinduism

Religious career
- Based in: Videha
- Disciple of: Uddalaka Aruni

Kahoda (Sanskrit: कहोड) was a Vedic sage in the Mithila Kingdom of the ancient Indian subcontinent. He was an Acharya of Vedas in the Mithila region. He was the father of the famous Indian philosopher Ashtavakra.

Kahoda is also mentioned the text Valmiki's Ramayana. He is referenced in the verse 6.119.17 of the Yuddha Kāṇḍa in the text. According to the verse, when the war of Ramayana concluded, Daśaratha came to see his son Rāma from heaven and told

O son! I have been conveyed across redeemed by you, who a deserving son and a great being; like the virtuous Brahmana Kahoḍa was redeemed by his son Aṣṭāvakra.

— Valmiki, Verse 6.119.17, Yudha Kanda, Ramayana

== Early life ==
According to the texts Satapatha Brahmana and Mahabharata, Kahoda was the son of kauṣītaki or kauṣītakeya. In the text Brihadaranyaka Upanishad, he is mentioned as Kahola, the son of kauṣītakeya. He was born in a poor Brahmin family in the Videha Kingdom. He studied Vedas at the Ashram of the Vedic sage Uddalaka Aruni.

== Later life ==
Kahoda was a brilliant student of Vedas among all the disciples of his teacher Uddalaka Aruni at his Ashram. Due to his brilliance knowledge in the Vedic study, his teacher Uddalaka Aruni was very pleased with him. Kahoda became the favourite disciple of his teacher. After the completion his Vedic study, he became the assistant teacher in the Ashram of Uddalaka Aruni. Later his teacher Uddalaka Aruni married his own daughter Sujata with him. After the marriage of Kahoda with Sujata, they still lived in the Ashram. Kahoda continued teaching Vedas to the disciples in the Ashram.

== Legacy ==
According to legend, the city of Kahalgaon in the Bhagalpur district of the present Bihar state in India, was named after Kahola Rishi, which is another name of the sage Kahoda.
