= Shastrartha =

Shastrartha (Sanskrit: शास्त्रार्थ, romanized: śāstrārtha) is a type of intellectual debate prevalent in India. It is a kind of philosophical and religious debate in which scholars participate to reveal the inner meaning (अर्थ) of Hindu scriptures known as the shastras (शास्त्र). There are three types of Shastrartha prevalent in India, namely, the Vadakatha (healthy discussions which targeted the truth), the Jalpakatha (where two contradictory interpretations contested with each other) and the Vitandakatha (which attacked the other views without establishing their own view). The Vadakatha was done among the Guru and Shishya or among the people belonging to the same philosophical school. While the latter two were done among the people of different schools or with the antagonistic sects. People vied with each other for winning the contest by showing their knowledge of the ancient scriptures.

== Notable shastrarthas ==
- Debate between Sambandar and Tamil Jains (7th century CE): Sambandar, who lived in the 7th century CE, defeated the Tamil Jain monks in a series of shastrartha on philosophy, thereby converting a Jain Pandyan king to Shaivism. The Jains voluntarily impaled themselves in order to fulfill their vow after losing the debate. However, scholars have questioned the historicity of the impalement.
- Debate between Adi Shankara and Mandana Mishra (8th century CE): The Advaita Vedanta philosopher Adi Shankara and the Purva Mimamsa scholar Mandana Mishra (Note: He is often identified with Sureśvara, though the authenticity of this is doubtful) engaged in a high-stakes intellectual duel, in the ancient city of Mahishmati, centered on whether liberation (moksha) is achieved through the householder's path of scriptural rituals (karma) or the ascetic's path of non-dual self-knowledge (jnana). Formally structured as a vada-katha—a collaborative debate aimed at establishing ultimate scriptural truth rather than malicious refutation—the encounter required the loser to adopt the lifestyle and philosophical school of the victor. Impartially judged by Mishra's scholarly wife, Ubhaya Bharati, the traditional hagiographies, such as the Madhaviya Shankara Digvijaya, record that the debate concluded with Mishra's defeat. While modern scholars note that historical timelines and textual variations exist regarding the narrative, it remains a definitive debate in ancient India.
- Debate at Thondanur / Court of King Vishnuvardhana (12th century CE): A historic cross-sectarian shastrartha took place in the Hoysala Empire under the patronage of the ruler Vishnuvardhana or Bittideva. Originally an ardent follower of Jainism, the king convened a formal multi-day theological dispute between his court's dominant Jain scholars and the visiting Sri Vaishnava philosopher Ramanujacharya, who had migrated to the region from the Chola kingdom. The debate was structured as a jalpa-katha—a contest between contradictory schools of thought. Traditional Sri Vaishnava hagiographies record that the Jains demanded a rigid scriptural defense before allowing Ramanujacharya to influence the monarchy. Ramanujacharya successfully refuted the Jain philosophical tenets, establishing the systematic base of the Vishishtadvaita (qualified non-dualism) school. Following the defeat of the Jain scholars, Bittideva formally converted to Vaishnavism, adopted the name "Vishnuvardhana", and initiated the construction of landmark monumental temples like the Chennakesava Temple at Belur. This debate remains a definitive historical marker for religious disputation in medieval South India, signaling a major state-sponsored transition from Jainism to the theistic Bhakti tradition.
- Debate at Galtaji (1718 CE): In 1718, the Galtaji temple complex near Jaipur hosted a historic shastrartha under the patronage of Maharaja Sawai Jai Singh II. The dominant local Ramanandi scholars initiated a formal theological challenge against the Gaudiya Vaishnava tradition. The Ramanandis argued that because the Gaudiya lineage lacked a distinct commentary on the Vedanta sutra, it could not be recognized as an orthodox sampradaya eligible to independently worship prominent royal deities like Govindaji. To defend the tradition, the scholar Baladeva Vidyabhusana was dispatched to the court, where he participated in the debate and composed the Govinda Bhashya—a comprehensive Gaudiya commentary on the Vedanta-sutra. Vidyabhusana successfully demonstrated the scriptural orthodoxy of his school and its theological affiliation with the ancient Madhva lineage, resulting in a decisive victory that secured royal recognition for Gaudiya Vaishnavism.
- Kashi Assembly debate on Vallabha Sampradaya (1860s): This shastrartha occurred when the Maharaja of Benares, Ishwari Prasad Narayan Singh, convened an assembly of Sanskrit scholars at the Benares Sanskrit College to evaluate the theological legitimacy of the Vallabha Sampradaya (Pushtimarg sect). Triggered by the legal and religious fallout of the 1862 Maharaj libel case in Bombay—which had subjected the sect's localized practices and hereditary lineage to heavy public scrutiny—the Varanasi orthodox elite sought to formally determine if the sect departed from Vedic and Puranic orthodoxy. Structured as a formal vada (scholarly assembly aimed at truth-seeking), the Kashi Vidvat Parishad and dominant court pandits cross-examined sectarian texts against classical Vedanta parameters. Despite widespread criticism of the sect's contemporary leadership in the colonial press, the assembly of Kashi pandits ultimately affirmed the structural validity of Vallabhacharya’s Shuddhadvaita (pure non-dualism) philosophy, certifying it as a legitimate branch of orthodox Vaishnavism rather than an unsanctioned heterodox innovation. This debate remains a critical milestone in modern shastrartha history, highlighting how traditional scholastic authority responded to colonial legal frameworks.
- Kashi Assembly debate of Swami Dayananda Saraswati (1869 CE): This shastrartha took place on November 16, 1869 at Anand Bagh in Varanasi (Kashi), presided over by Maharaja Ishwari Prasad Narayan Singh of Benaras. The debate featured the Vedic reformer Swami Dayananda Saraswati (later the founder of the Arya Samaj) aligned against an assembly of over twenty-seven orthodox pandits led by Swami Vishuddhananda (Note: Not to be confused with the namesake president of Ramakrishna Mission) and the renowned grammarian Pandit Balashastri. Formally structured as a jalpa-katha, the debate centered on the question of whether the textual corpus of the Vedas explicitly sanctions idol worship (murti-puja). Dayananda challenged the orthodox scholars to produce definitive scriptural evidence from the Samhitas, arguing that Vedic religion is strictly non-anthropomorphic. The institutional outcome remains contested; orthodox accounts assert Dayananda was decisively defeated on technical scriptural grounds, whereas Arya Samaj records allege tactical manipulation and disruptive shouting by the traditionalists. Despite these polarized narratives, modern historians view the event as a monumental cultural shift. The debate paved the way for the institutional crystallization of the "Back to the Vedas" movement in Northern India.
- Hooghly debate of Swami Dayananda Saraswati (1873 CE): This shastrartha took place in Hooghly, Bengal in 1873, marking a crucial expansion of Dayananda Saraswati's reform movement outside North India. Following his interactions with Brahmo Samaj leaders in Calcutta, Swami Dayananda Saraswati challenged the orthodox pandits of Bengal to a public theological disputation formally structured as a jalpa-katha. The debate focused on the scriptural validity of idol worship (murti-puja) and whether post-Vedic texts like the Puranas possessed absolute authority. Dayananda argued that the core Samhitas did not support anthropomorphic deity worship, a stance heavily resisted by the local orthodox elite. The transcribed arguments of this debate were subsequently preserved and published under the title Hugli Shastrarth Tatha Pratima Pujan Vichar (initially printed in Bengali and later translated into Hindi), serving as one of the earliest documented vernacular transcripts of a modern reformist debate. Historians note that this assembly was instrumental in refining Dayananda’s approach to public disputation, which expanded the accessibility and socio-religious impact of his subsequent shastrarthas.
- 1921 Ujjain Kumbh Mela debate (1921 CE): This shastrartha took place during the 1921 Ujjain Simhastha (Kumbh Mela) in Ujjain. For centuries, the Ramanandi Sampradaya had been structurally categorised as a branch of the South Indian Sri Vaishnava (Ramanuja) tradition, following the traditional lineage tracing Swami Ramananda as a regular disciple of Ramanuja. However, a radical faction within the Ramanandis, led by Swami Bhagavadacharya (alias Bhagvad Das), sought to sever ties with the Tenkalai lineage, arguing that South Indian rituals and strict caste rigidities compromised the egalitarian, Rama-centric essence of North Indian Vaishnavism. Formally structured as a theological shastrartha to settle the dependency of their guru-parampara (lineage), Bhagavadacharya contested against Swami Ramprapann Ramanujadas of the Totadri Math. Utilizing the Anandabhashya commentary on the Brahma Sutras attributed to Ramananda, Bhagavadacharya successfully argued that the Ramanandi lineage originated independently from Lord Rama via Hanuman and Valmiki, rather than Ramanuja. The jury declared the Ramanandis victorious, formally declaring the order an autonomous sampradaya. While the verdict permanently purged Ramanuja from the official Ramanandi lineage, it also sparked deep internal controversies, with conservative factions within the order alleging text forgery and systemic bias. It also cemented the Ramanandi sect's absolute control over major North Indian holy sites like Ayodhya, paving the way for them to become the dominant monastic force in the region today.
- Debate between Swami Karpatri and Pandit Madan Mohan Malaviya (1932 CE): A notable twentieth-century institutional shastrartha occurred between Swami Karpatri and Pandit Madan Mohan Malaviya. The debate pitted Dasanami sannyasi Swami Karpatri against Malaviya, the reform-oriented founder of Banaras Hindu University. Formally structured as a three-day public disputation arbitrated by prominent householders Seth Jayadayal Goyandka and Seth Gaurishankar Goenka, the debate centered on the scriptural parameters governing the public recitation of the pranava (Om) and the legal limits of socio-religious reform within classical Dharmaśāstra frameworks. Karpatri deployed classical Vedic and Puranic commentaries to contest the unrestricted, public recitation of esoteric mantras, thereby challenging the textual validity of Malaviya’s inclusionary socio-political initiatives and his broader nationalist religious framework. Traditional accounts record that the mediators ruled in favor of Karpatri’s strictly textual scriptural position, prompting Malaviya to formally concede the debate. The encounter served as a pivotal historical marker, dramatically introducing Karpatri to the wider public sphere and establishing him as a prominent, uncompromised textual authority who would later lead institutional traditionalist challenges against twentieth-century social legislation.

== See also ==
- Debates in ancient India
- Nyaya Sutra
- Disputation
