= Vana Parva =

Third book of the Mahabharata

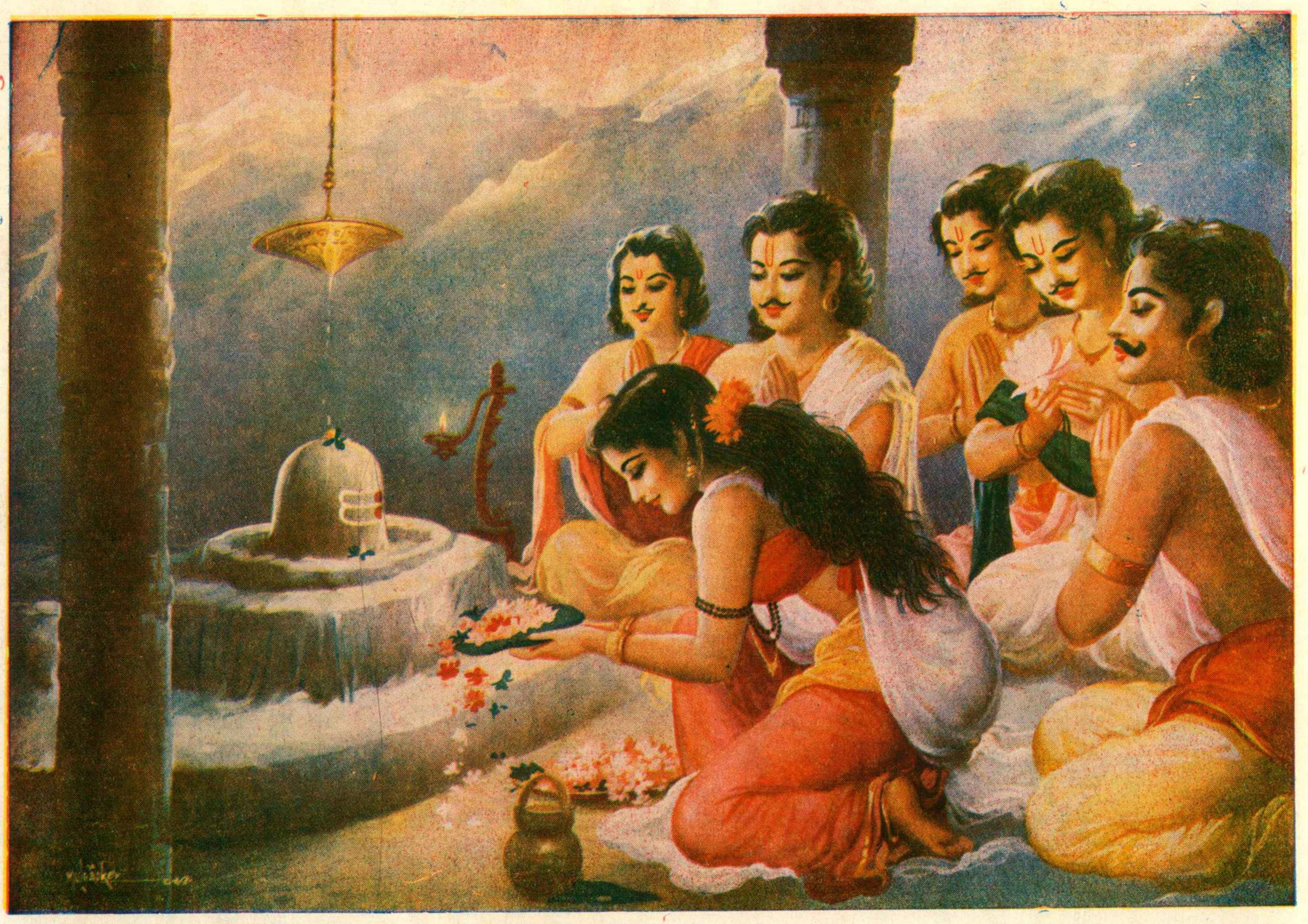
The Pandavas and Draupadi worshipping Shiva during their exile, a scene from the Vana Parva

The Vana Parva ("Book of the Forest") is the third of the eighteen parvas (books) of the Indian epic Mahabharata. Vana Parva traditionally has 21 parts and 324 chapters. The critical edition of Vana Parva contains 16 parts and 299 chapters.

The parva is a chronicle of the twelve-year journey of the Pandavas in a forest, where they learn life lessons and build character.

Vana Parva contains discourses on virtues and ethics; myths of Arjuna, Yudhishthara, and Bhima; and the tales of "Nahusha the Snake and Yudhishthira" and "Ushinara and the Hawk". It also includes the love stories of "Nala and Damayanti" and "Savitri and Satyavan".

== Structure and chapters ==
The Vana Parva traditionally has 21 upa-parvas (parts, little books) and 324 adhyayas (chapters).

=== Aranyaka Parva (chapters: 1–10) ===
The Pandavas are exiled to the forest of Kamyaka. A group of Brahmanas follows the Pandavas to the forest, Yudhisthira prays to Surya, who grants him the boon of supplying food for thirteen years. A sage named Saunaka consoles Yudhisthira. Vidura advises Dhritarashtra to recall Yudhishthira and give him back his kingdom. Dhritarashtra refuses, so Vidura leaves and joins the Pandava brothers. On request, Vidura again returns to Hastinapur. Vyasa counsels Dhritarashtra to make peace with the Pandavas; Maitreya comes to counsel Duryodhana, but he turns deaf-ear; Maitreya curses him to die at the hand of Bhima.

=== Kirmira-vadha Parva (chapter: 11) ===
There is a battle between the man-eating demon Kirmira and the giant Pandava brother, Bhima. Kirmira is killed.

=== Arjunabhigamana Parva (chapters: 12–37) ===
The Parva introduces Krishna and talks about his past accomplishments. Krishna criticizes gambling as one of four sins that ruin a man and laments being absent when Yudhishthira accepted a game of dice, because of dealing with the army of King Salwa. Yudhishthira expresses remorse and anguish for his gambling habit. Krishna suggests persuasion, followed by force if necessary, is appropriate to prevent one's friend before he commits a sinful act such as gambling. Draupadi appeals to Yudhishthira to wreak vengeance on the Kaurava (Kuru) brothers. The theory of forgiveness (e.g., when to forgive) is debated between various characters. The chapters also discuss anger and how it is destructive to a person and society. Draupadi and Yudhishthira debate over the cause and effect of actions (karma), free will, and destiny. Bhima and Yudhishthira argue over the definition of virtue (dharma), wealth (artha), and pleasure (kama). The arguments are left open-ended with no definite conclusion and the characters retire from the debate. Maharishi Vyasa arrives and shares the theory and knowledge of Pratismriti with the Pandavas. The Pandavas shift from Dwaitvana to the bank of river Saraswati. Arjuna leaves alone towards North, where he meets Indra, in the guise of a Brahmana who advises him to pray to Lord Shiva to obtain the celestial weapons.

=== Kairata (Kirata) Parva (chapters: 38–41) ===
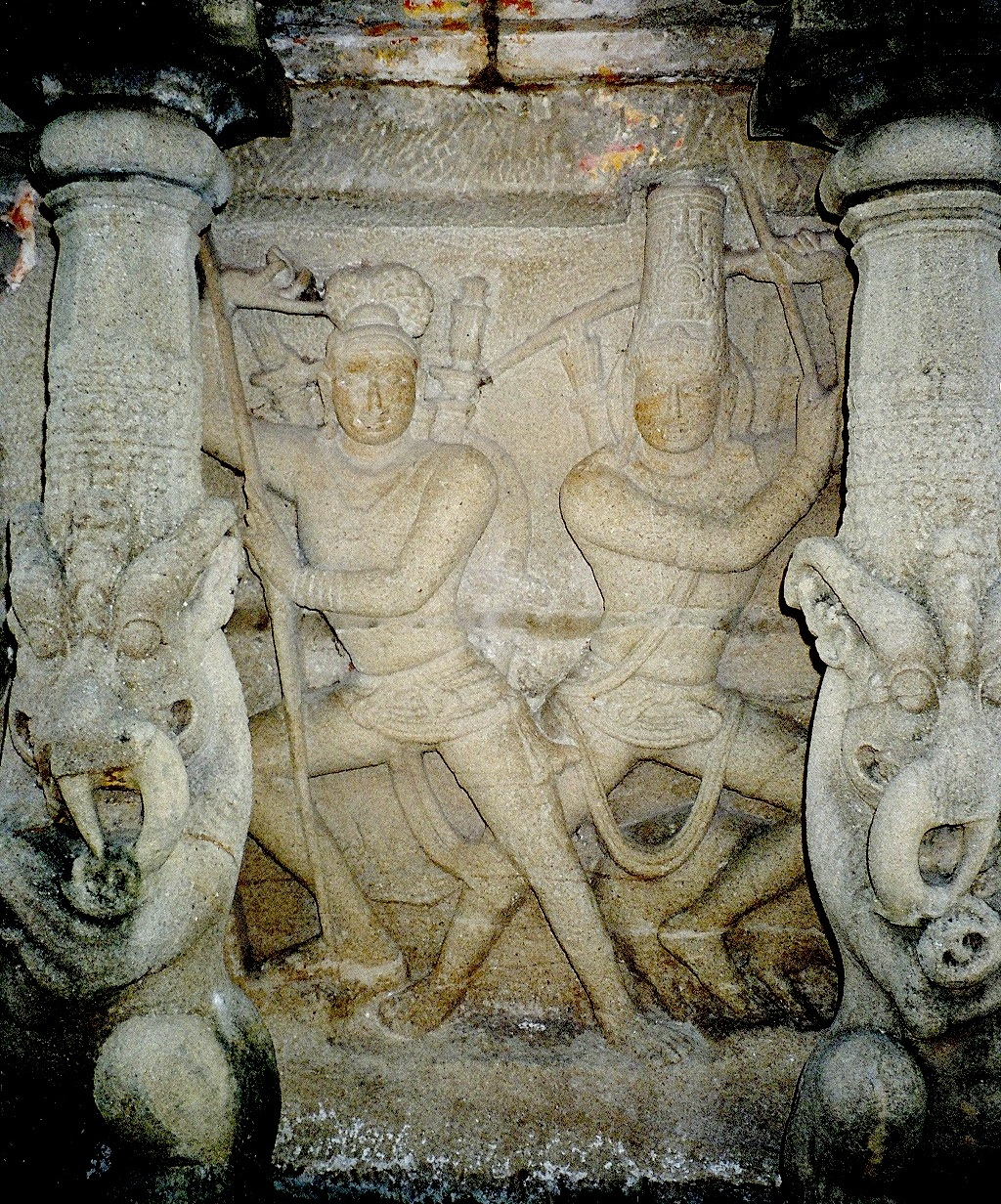
Arjuna fights Shiva disguised as the Kirata

Arjuna meditates and lives like an austere Rishi in the forest to gain knowledge. Due to his fierce penances, all Rishis went to the god Sthanu. Knowing Arjuna's desire, the god of Pinaka, disguised as Kirata, visit Arjuna, and is accompanied by Uma (his wife), spirits, and thousands of women. A boar attacks Arjuna but is struck down by two arrows. Arjuna and Kirata argue over who killed the boar. They battle each other, with Kirata remaining unharmed due to his divinity. After being depleted of arrows, Arjuna fights with his bow, which is snatched by Kirata. Arjuna's golden hilt sword breaks when he uses it to strike Kirata's head. They wrestle and Arjuna is deprived of his senses; when he awakens, Arjuna starts to worship Mahadeva by offering floral garlands. Sthanu reveals his true identity and blesses Arjuna with the knowledge of the Pasupata weapon. Indra and other deities visit Arjuna and provide him their weapons: Yama (lord of death) gives his mace, Varuna (lord of water) his divine noose, and Kubera (lord of treasures) his favorite weapon called "Antarddhana" (lit. "sleeping weapon").

=== Indralokagamana Parva (chapters: 42–51) ===
Arjuna visits heaven and the Parva describes the city of Indra. Gods furnish celestial weapons to Arjuna and goddess Urvasi attempts to seduce Arjuna. Arjuna refuses her advances, which infuriates Urvasi and causes her to curse him. Indra converts the curse into a boon.

=== Nalopakhyana Parva (chapters: 52–79) ===
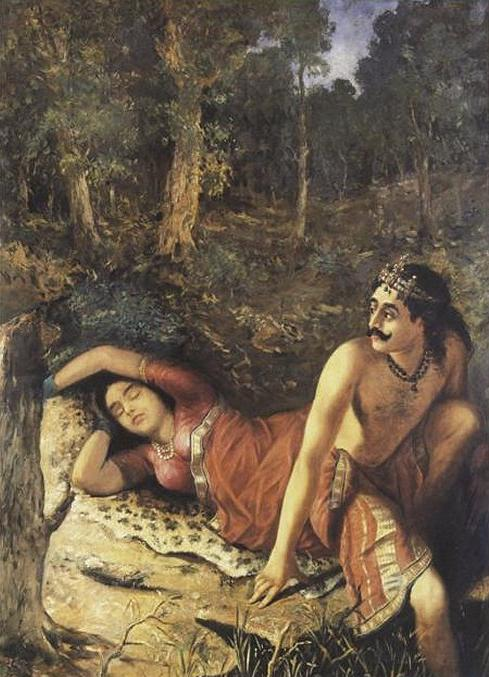
In the forest, Nala leaving Damayanti while she is sleeping.

Yudhishthira regrets his gambling problem and declares himself the most wretched person on earth. Vrihadashwa consoles him with the story of Nala, another prince who erred by gambling and recovered from his mistake. Nalopakhyana Parva recites the love story of the prince Nala and princess Damayanti, who fell in love with each other without having met after learning about each other through a hansa (lit. "swan"). Damayanti's father announces a Swayamvara—a contest between eligible bachelors so that Damayanti can watch and choose the man she wants to marry. The gods arrive to win over Damayanti and pick Nala as their representative and messenger. Nala is conflicted but tries to convince Damayanti that she marry Indra or one of the deities. Damayanti picks Nala instead. One of the gods gets upset at Damayanti's choice, so he challenges Nala to a game of dice. Nala loses the game and the kingdom to Pushkara. He goes into exile, Nala and Damayanti are separated. Damayanti runs away from her father's kingdom. Several chapters describe their tribulations and adventures. Damayanti's father finds her and she returns to the kingdom. A second Swayamvara is announced. Nala comes to the kingdom disguised as Vahuka. Damayanti discovers Vahuka and knows his true identity; they meet and talk. Nala reclaims his kingdom from Pushkara. Damayanti and Nala take over the kingdom and live happily ever after. The story inspires Yudhishthira to focus on the future.

=== Tirtha-yatra Parva (chapters: 80–157) ===
Sage Narada visits the Pandava brothers. He suggests tirthas to the Pandava brothers—a pilgrimage to holy places in India. The Parva provides the benefits, directions, and a list of tirthas, including Kurukshetra, Ganga, Yamuna, Prayaga, Pratisthana, and Brahmasara. The Pandavas start the Narada-recommended tirthas and the history of various gods is described. The Parva includes the story of Ushinara, the pigeon, and the hawk: a story that explores the concept of dharma and conflicting virtues. Other stories include king Janaka's sacrifice; king Somaka and his liberation from hell; how Bhagiratha brought the Ganges river to earth from heaven; the births of Ashtavakra, Mandhata and Rishyasringa; and Bhima's for celestial lotuses.

=== Yaksha-yudha Parva (chapters: 158–164) ===
A demon kidnaps Yudhishthira, Draupadi, and the twins; Bhima finds and slays the demon. The Pandavas arrive at the hermitage of Arshtishena. Arjuna returns from heaven.

=== Nivata-kavacha-yudha Parva (chapters: 165–175) ===
Arjuna describes his travel, why he left, where he was, and what he did. Arjuna shows the celestial weapons he now possessed. He demonstrates their effectiveness by destroying the aerial city of Hiranyapura before demonstrating more of his power to Yudhishthira. Sage Narada appears in chapter 175 and advises that war and weapons should not be unleashed unless there is necessary and compelling cause, that rash violence is destructive and wrong. Arjuna stops committing acts of violence.

=== Ajagara Parva (chapters: 176–181) ===
The Pandavas arrive at Kailaca. A mighty snake, Nahusha, ties up Bhima. Yudhishthira finds him in the snake's grip. The snake offers to free Bhima if Yudhishthira answers his questions. The snake and Yudhishthira ask each other questions on dharma, the theory of birth-rebirth, transmigration, the theory of varnas, the relative merit of four virtues (charity, kind speech, truthfulness, and unenviousness), universal spirit, and how to achieve moksha in Chapters 180 to 181. The snake is freed from its curse and releases Bhima. The snake is revealed to be Nahusha and achieves salvation.

=== Markandeya-Samasya Parva (chapters: 182–231) ===
Markandeya presents the story of yugas (Kreta, Treta, Dapara and Kali yugas), and of Vami horses. Through Chapters 200 to 206, the Parva offers contrasting views on traditions and rituals, knowledge and personal development, and vice and virtues. The Parva, in Chapters 207–211, presents one of the many discussions on the doctrine of karma in Mahabharata. Chapters 211 to 215 explain the relationship between self-discipline, virtues, and qualities (sattva, rajas and tamas), how these qualities enable one to achieve knowledge of the supreme spirit. Markandeya-Samasya Parva recites the story of Vrihaspati and Skanda.

=== Draupadi-Satyabhama Samvada Parva (chapters: 232–234) ===
Satyabhama asks Draupadi for advice on how to win Krishna's affections. Draupadi outlines the duties of a wife.

=== Ghosha-yatra Parva (chapters: 235–256) ===
Sakuni advises Duryodhana to confront the Pandavas in exile, but Dhritarashtra dissuades Duryodhana. After being granted permission from the king, Duryodhana is accompanied by Karna, Sakuni, and many of his brothers to the Dwaitavana (lake). They meet the Gandharvas there and ask them to leave; the Gandharvas refuse. Duryodhana enters with his armed forces but is pushed back by Chitrasena. Duryodhana is captured and the fleeing soldiers approached the Pandavas for help. Arjuna vows to rescue Duryodhana and defeats Chitrasena and the Gandharvas. Yudhishthira's act of kindness makes Duryodhana, who refuses to return to his kingdom, despondent. Karna and Shakuni try to soothe Duryodhana but fail. Inside his mind, Duryodhana sees a demon that asks him to stop despairing. As long as Bhisma, Drona, and Karna are by his side he should not fear. Regaining consciousness, he declares that he will defeat the Pandavas in battle and returned to the kingdom.

=== Mriga Sapnovbhava Parva (chapter: 257) ===
Yudhishthira has a dream about a deer, who complains that the Pandavas living in the forest have invited many people to live there. The residents hunt indiscriminately and the deer fear they will be exterminated. The deer pleads with Yudhishthira to move to another location, which will protect them from extinction. Yudhishthira concludes that it is his dharma to ensure the welfare of all creatures. The Pandava brothers agree that the wildlife deserves their compassion and decide to move. The Pandavas move from Dwaita Aranya forest to Kamyaka forest.

=== Vrihi Drounika Parva (chapters: 258–260) ===
Chapter 258 describes the 11th year of the Pandavas' exile. Sage Vyasa visits the Pandavas and instructs them on morality. Vyasa recites the story of Rishi Mudgala, who after his death refused to be taken to heaven. The story then describes Parabrahma, a place of contemplation, and Jnana yoga, which is the path Mudgala chose for his eternal emancipation.

=== Draupadi-harana Parva (chapters: 261–270) ===
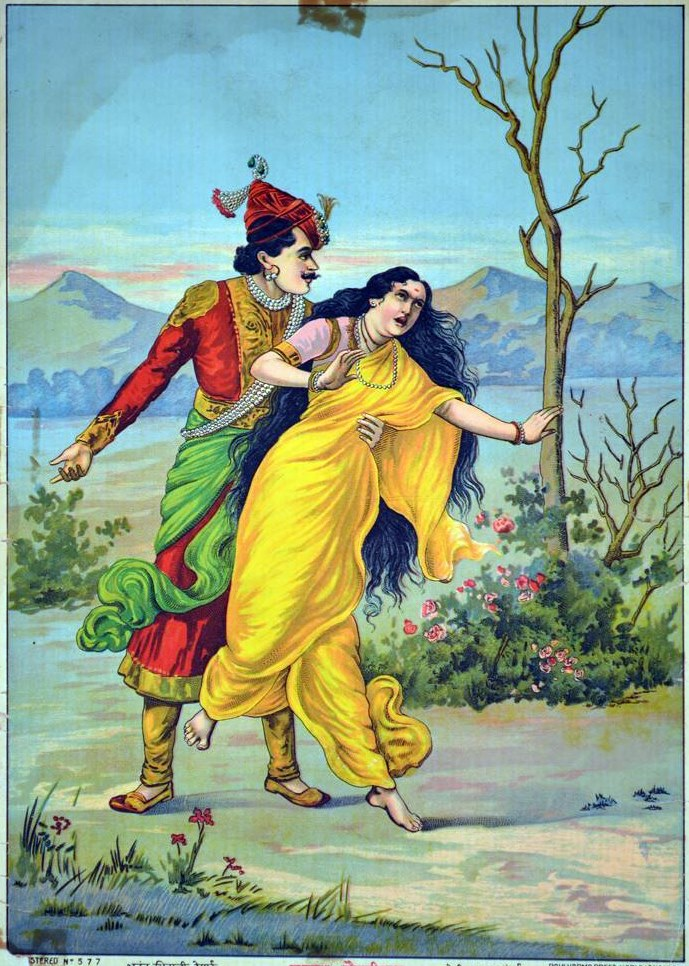
Jayadratha abducts Draupadi

Draupadi is kidnapped by Jayadratha and the Pandavas go to rescue her. The story describes the battle and death of Jayadratha's followers and his capture. Jayadratha is not killed but is questioned by Yudhishthira.

=== Jayadhratha Vimokshana Parva (chapter: 271) ===
Yudhishthira sets Jayadratha free, who returns to his house in anger, planning ways to take revenge against the Pandavas.

=== Rama Upakhyana Parva (chapters: 272–291) ===
The Parva recites a short summary of Ramayana to comfort Yudhishthira who laments the long exile his brothers have suffered.

=== Pativrata-mahatmya Parva (chapters: 292–298) ===
Pativrata-mahatmya parva describes the love story of princess Savitri and the hermit Satyavan. They meet and fall in love. Sage Narada informs Savitri that Satyayan is certain to die within a year; Savitri accepts and weds Satyayan anyway. Savitri, who knows Satyavan will die soon, stays with him all the time. One day Satyavan and Savitri head into the forest to collect wood when Satyavan dies. Yama, the lord of death, appears before Savitri. Yama carries away Satyavan's soul and Savitri follows. Yama tries to persuade her to move on, but she refuses to relent. She obtains four boons from Yama, which allows Satyavan to be resurrected. Savitri and Satyavan live happily together.

=== Kundalaharana Parva (chapters: 299–309) ===
The parva recites the story of Karna. The chapters describe how Karna grows up and learns to be an expert bowman. Yudhishthira worried about his brother's Arjuna life was in danger when he learnt about Karna's vow. In the Pandavas' 13th year of exile, Indra asks Karna for his earrings to benefit his son. Surya warns Karna in his dream to refuse Indra's request for the earrings, saying that by doing so he will die. Karna refuses to do so due to his charity and promise were important than his life. Surya then convinces him to ask Indra for the dart that is capable of slaying all foes. The following day, Indra disguises himself as Brahmana and exchanges Karna's earrings for his Vasavi dart, on the condition that it could be used only on a single person. Karna takes the dart and gives Indra his mail. Indra warns Karna that the dart's target is protected by Narayana (Krishna). Hearing that Karna had been tricked, all of Dhritarashtra's sons became distressed. This introduction to Karna sets the stage for future chapters, as Karna plays a major role in later books of the Mahabharata.

=== Aranya (Araneya) Parva (chapters: 310–324) ===
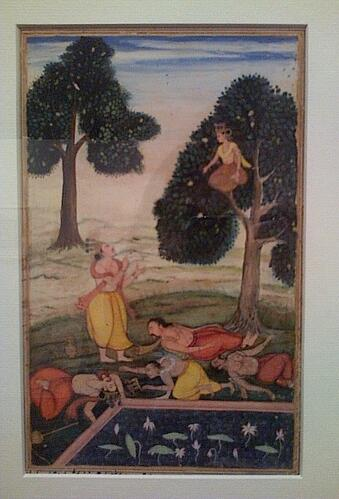
Yudhisthira answers the Yaksha's questions

The Pandavas return to Dwaita Aranya forest. They chase and fail to capture a deer who has carried away the firesticks of a priest. The Pandava brothers rest from exhaustion and thirst. Each one (except Yudhishthira) goes to a lake to fetch water and disregards the words of a disembodied voice. They drop dead after drinking the water. Yudhishthira goes to the lake and laments the death of his brothers. Yaksha appears and interrogates Yudhishthira with 124 questions about the nature of human life, the necessary virtues for a happy life, ethics, and morality, which Yudhishthira answers correctly. Yaksha then asks him to choose one of his brothers to be revived as a reward. He asks that his step-brother Nakula be revived so that, for the sake of virtue, one son of each of his father's two wives remain. Yaksha is impressed by Yudhishthira's morality, revives all the Pandava brothers, and reveals himself to be Dharma (Lord of justice and Yudhishthira's father). He awards Yudhishthira several boons that help the Pandavas in their 13th year of exile for a concealed life, and returns the priest's firesticks.

== English translations ==
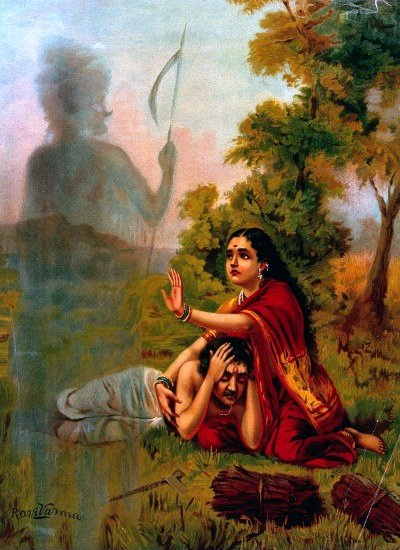
The story of Savitri and Satyavan is described in Aranya Parva.

Several translations of the Sanskrit book Vana Parva in English are available. Two translations from 19th century, now in public domain, are by Kisari Mohan Ganguli and Manmatha Nath Dutt. The translations vary with each translator's interpretations. Compare:

The original Sanskrit:

क्षमा धर्मः क्षमा यज्ञः क्षमा वेदाः क्षमा श्रुतम |
यस ताम एवं विजानाति स सर्वं क्षन्तुम अर्हति ||
क्षमा ब्रह्म क्षमा सत्यं क्षमा भूतं च भावि च |
क्षमा तपः क्षमा शौचं क्षमया चॊद्धृतं जगत ||

— Kashyapa quoted in Arjunabhigamana Parva, Vana Parva, Mahabharata Book iii

Kisari Mohan Ganguli's translation:

Forgiveness is virtue; forgiveness is sacrifice, forgiveness is the Vedas, forgiveness is the Shruti. He that knoweth this is capable of forgiving everything. Forgiveness is Brahma; forgiveness is truth; forgiveness is stored ascetic merit; forgiveness protecteth the ascetic merit of the future; forgiveness is asceticism; forgiveness is holiness; and by forgiveness is it that the universe is held together.

— Kashyapa quoted in Arjunabhigamana Parva, Aranya Parva, Mahabharata Book iii.29

and Manmatha Nath Dutt's translation:

Forgiveness is virtue, forgiveness is sacrifice, forgiveness is the Vedas, forgiveness is Sruti,
he who knows all this is capable of forgiving all.
Forgiveness is Brahma, forgiveness is truth, forgiveness is accumulated and future (ascetic) merit,
forgiveness is the devout penance, forgiveness is purity, and by forgiveness is the universe sustained.

— Kashyapa quoted in Arjunabhigamana Parva, Vana Parva, Mahabharata Book iii.29

J. A. B. van Buitenen completed an annotated edition of Vana Parva, based on the critically edited and least corrupted version of Mahabharata known in 1975. In 2011, Debroy notes that the updated critical edition of Vana Parva, with spurious and corrupted text removed, has 16 parts, 299 adhyayas {{nobold|(chapters) and 10,239 shlokas (verses). Debroy published a translated version of a critical edition of Vana Parva in Volume 2 and 3 of his series.

Clay Sanskrit Library has published a 15 volume set of the Mahabharata which includes a translation of Vana Parva by William Johnson. This translation is modern and uses an old manuscript of the epic. The translation does not remove verses and chapters now widely believed to be spurious.

The entire parva has been "transcreated" and translated in verse by the poet Dr. Purushottama Lal published by Writers Workshop.

== Inspiration for later works ==
The Kirata sub-parva of Aranya Parva has inspired several major poems and expanded works, such as the Kirātārjunīya by Bhāravi.

== See also ==
- Previous book of Mahabharata: Sabha Parva
- Next book of Mahabharata: Virata Parva
