= Lomaharshana =

A principal narrator of Puranas

- लोमहर्षण

Suta Gaddi
- Succeeded by: Ugrashravas

Personal life
- Died: Suta Gaddi
- Children: Ugrashravas
- Education: Vyasa Peetha
- Known for: Story telling of Puranas
- Other name: Romaharshana
- Occupation: Narrator of Puranas

Religious life
- Religion: Hinduism
- Institute: Shaunaka Mahashala

Religious career
- Teacher: Veda Vyasa
- Based in: Naimisharanya forest
- Post: Suta
- Disciple of: Veda Vyasa

Lomaharshana (Sanskrit: लोमहर्षण, Romanised: Lomaharṣaṇa) also known as Romaharshana was a sage and a principal Suta mentioned in the texts Puranas. He was a disciple of the revered Vedic sage Veda Vyasa and was well versed in Puranas. He recited the 18 Puranas to the sages at the assembly of the Shaunaka Mahashala in the sacred forest of Naimisharanya. He was the father of the second Suta Ugrashravas. Lomaharshana also compiled a voluminous Purana having four thousands verses in it.

According to the texts of Puranas, Lomaharshana recounted the story of the division of the Vedas, to the sages when they asked.

== Etymology ==
Lomaharshana or Romaharshana is made by two Indic terms Loman or Roma and harshana. The Indic term Loman or Roma denotes body-hairs and the term harshana means thrilled. According to Puranas, the recitations of Puranas by the Suta at assembly of Shaunaka Mahashala, thrilled the assembled sages so deeply that their body-hairs (Loman or Roma) stood up. Thus, the suta was epithetically called Lomaharshana or Romaharshana and later became famous with this name.

== Disciple of Veda Vyasa ==
According to the text Vishnu Purana, Veda Vyasa was enjoined by Lord Brahma to arrange the Vedas into four divisions. Then, Veda Vyasa selected his four notable disciples Paila, Vaiśampāyana, Jaimini and Sumantu for achieving this purpose. At the same time he also selected Lomaharshana as his disciple in historical and legendary traditions.
