= Adṛṣṭa =

Hindu philosophical concept

The Fifth Chapter of the Vaisheshika Sutras of Kanada deals with the notion of action and the connected concept of effort; and also deals with the special phenomenon of the supersensible force, called Adrishta.

== Meaning ==
The Sanskrit term, Adrishta (Sanskrit: अदृष्ट) or Adrsta, as an adjective means - not seen, unseen, unobserved, unforeseen, unknown, invisible, unexpected, not experienced, destiny, fate, luck, not permitted or sanctioned, illegal, virtue or vice as the eventual cause of pleasure or pain. In Hindu philosophy it refers to the unseen force, and the invisible results of works which accrue to a person; it refers to the Doctrine of Apurva.

== Mimamsa concept ==
Adrishta, literally meaning unseen, in the Mimamsa context refers to the invisible result of a ritual that accrues to a person, and in the Vaisheshika context, synonymous with Adharma, to the equally invisible negative karmic accrual, as the unknown quality of things and of the soul, and brings about the cosmic order and arranges for soul according to their merits or demerits. Adrishta is all the elements which are not known and verified with the help of the five senses, and which can be realized through mind, intelligence and soul.

Each successive birth or incarnation and its possibilities are determined by the Adrishta and Samskara acquired in the previous incarnations – Adrishta and Samskara, without which the Atman has never been, because its series of incarnations never began. Adrishta is Potential worth which must have been acquired in a human state to relate to a human state; it gives unity to the multiplicity and infinite variety of beings, and of the things under their control, it binds them into a single system and an organic whole. Prashasta hints that the existence of the Universe itself though not due to Brahma's Adrishta is not free from Adrishta (Moral merit). All current actions and planned future actions get planted in Adrishta.

== Vaisheshika concept ==
The concept of adrsta is discussed in the Vaiśeṣika Sūtra, the main text of the Vaisheshika Hindu school of philosophy, as part of its philosophical discussion on the nature of the universe. After explaining the atomistic cosmology that this school theorizes as the constituents of universe, it focuses on explaining phenomena such as motion and change. These occurrences are attributed to manifestations of adrsta, or invisible forces and fields as causative reasons behind change. Vaiśeṣika scholars explain Adr̥ṣṭa as what intermediates between cause and effect but is not seen. The Vaisheshika school also uses Adrsta concept in its formulation of the Karma doctrine.

The term Vaisheshika, appearing only once in Vaisheshika Sutra X.ii.7 and meaning characteristic or distinguishing, according to Pāṇini (Sutra IV.iii.87) is derived from the word Vishesha meaning species, distinction, difference, excellence or superiority. Uluka, who was before the birth of Gautama Buddha and is commonly known as Kanada, compiled the Vaisheshika sutras. Gautama who founded the Nyaya School came later. The term Adrishta appears in Vaisheshika Sutra V.i.15:

मणिगमनं सूच्यभिसर्पणमदृष्टकारणकम् |

"The movement of the jewel (and) the approach of the needle, (both) have adrishtam (the invisible consequences of previous acts) as their cause."

The reason of the movement of the jewel is not a particular volition but the efficient cause is the merit of the former possessor or the demerit of the thief. The non-combative cause is its conjunction with soul possessing adrishta (or results of actions in previous states of existence) and the combinative cause is the jewel. Adrishta is also the cause of attraction of the needle towards a loadstone (magnet). Owing to adrishta is the upwards flaming of fire, the sideward motion of air and the actions of atoms at the beginning of creation. Kanada, later on, tells us that even action in earth results from impulse, impact, and conjunction with the conjunct and is caused by Adrishta (Vaisheshika Sutra V.ii.1-2). The fruits or rewards of yajnas or sacrifice are not dispensed by any beneficent God. Apurva bestows the reward on the sacrificer. Apurva is the essential link between work and its result; it is a positive and unseen force created by an act that leads to the attainment of the fruit of action. This is the view of Jaimini though not implicitly mentioned by him but accepted by Prabhakara and Kumarila as one of the fundamental tenets of their respective schools. Later on, it came to be said that Apurva is the function of God. Kumarila insists that fruits of karmas accrue in this very life and not in some future life. Bhartṛmitra, who lived long before Sabara who lived long before Kumarila, does not accept Apurva. However, Patanjali tells us –

क्लेशमूलः कर्माशयो दृष्टादृष्टजन्मवेदनीयः (Yoga Sutras II.12)

that obstacles are the breeding ground for tendencies that give rise to actions and the consequences thereof; such obstacles are experienced as visible and invisible obstacles. Swami Prabhavananda translates this sutra as – "A man’s latent tendencies have been created by his past thoughts and actions; these tendencies will bear fruits, both in this life and in lives to come."

Apurva is an epistemic mechanism that indicates knowledge of causal links between acts and their consequences. Sabara discusses this concept in his commentary on the Vaisheshika Sutras, and even claims that by the word codana (Sanskrit: चोदन -meaning precept or rule -the performative element of an injunction) Jaimini really meant Apurva; it is mentioned by Jaimini in passing, as part of purvapaksha argument in Mimamasa Sutra I.ii.9.

== Significance ==
The early Mimamsakas believed in an adrishta that was the result of performing karmas and saw no need for an Ishvara in their system. However, the Atomic Theory which teaches that the world is produced by the successive formation of compounds due to the aggregation of atoms resulting from the motion of atoms, the primary motion brought about by the unseen the Adrishta residing in the primary atoms and residing in the individual souls is rejected by the followers of the Vedanta (Uttara Mimamsa) schools:

उभयथापि न कर्मातस्तदभावः | (Brahma Sutras II.ii.12)

"In either case (viz the Adrishta, the unseen principle, inhering either in the atoms or in the soul) the activity (of the atoms) is not (possible), therefore the negation of that (viz of creation through the combination of atoms)."

The Nyaya-Vaisheshika systems of philosophy derive the conception of moksha from the Upanishads but require a highly developed stage of logical thought, and care more for the instrument of knowledge than for knowledge itself. The Mimamsa system by the very nature of its ritualistic problems does not have much in common with Upanishadic philosophy.
