= Shaunaka Mahashala =

Gurukul of Shaunaka Rishi

- शौनक महाशाला
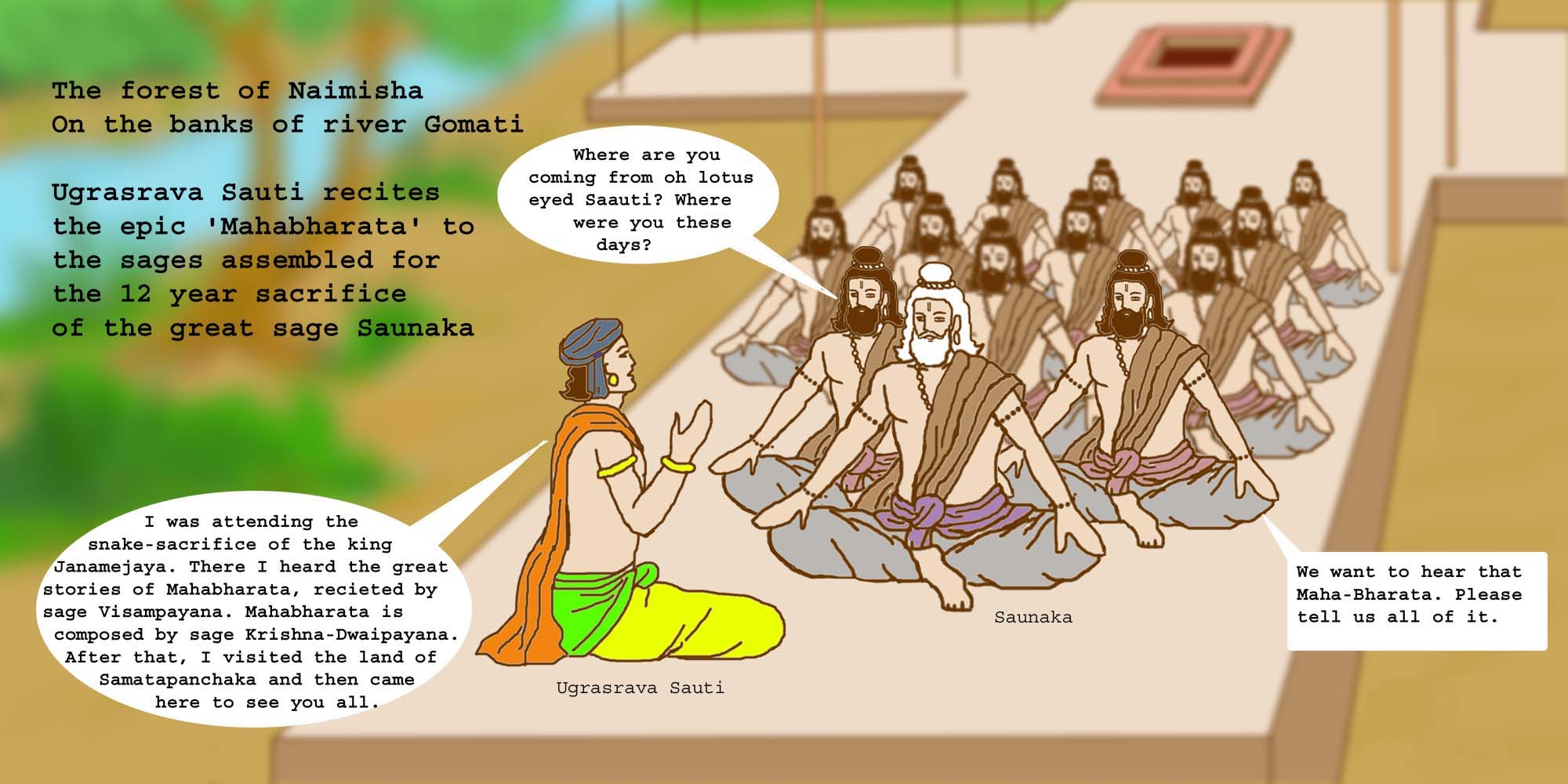
- Painting by Jijithnr showing Ugrasrava Sauti narrating Mahabharata to Saunaka and sages at the Suta Gaddi in the campus.

Monastery information
- Full name: Naimishyaranya University
- Other name: Shaunaka Rishi Ashram
- Dedication: Atharvaveda, Purana, Mahabharata

People
- Founder: Shaunaka
- Important associated figures: Shaunaka, Veda Vyasa, Pippalada, Lomaharshana, Ugrashravas

Architecture
- Heritage designation: Gurukul
- Architect: Cottage

Site
- Location: Naimiṣāraṇya (forest)

Shaunaka Mahashala was a higher educational institution founded by the ancient Indian Vedic philosopher Shaunaka Rishi in the ancient Naimisaranya forest. It was popular for a special assembly of sages headed by the revered sage Shaunaka. The revered sage Shaunaka was the Kulpati of the institution.

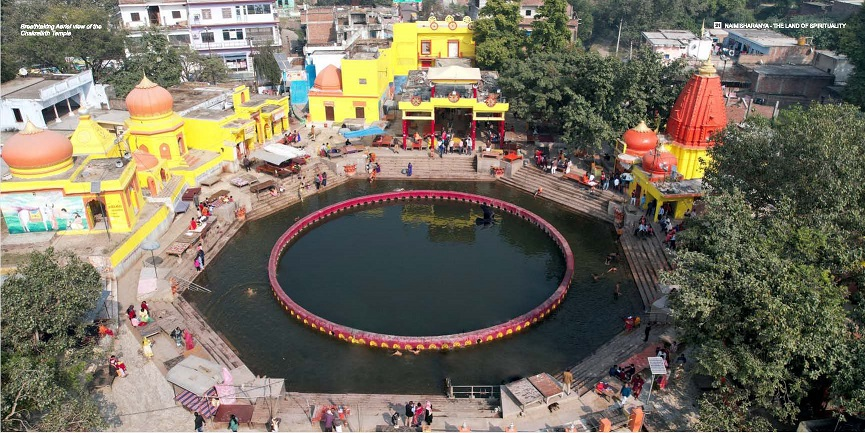
View of the Naimisharanya Teertha Kshetra.

The Vedic sage Shaunaka was a great scholar. He was also a great lover of learning. He financially patronised a great to the learning institution.

== Etymology ==
Shaunaka Mahashala is constituted with two words Shaunaka and Mahashala. Shaunaka was the name of the sage who was the chancellor. Mahashala or Mahāśāla is used instead of one who has ten thousand students under him. Also, Maha means great and Shala means institution. Therefore, Mahashala means a great institution. According to Promatha Nath Mullick, the institute in the sacred Naimisharanya forest represents an ancient Hindu University, whose chancellor was the Vedic sage Shaunaka.

== Background ==
According to the Vedic texts, Shaunaka Rishi's full name was Indrotdaivaya Shaunaka. He was a Vedic teacher and the son of the sage Bhriguvanshi Shunak. He was also called as Atidhanvan that translates to "Very wealthy person". He was financially rich Rishi among the sages in the Naimisharanya forest. He was running a grand Gurukul having ten thousand students and he was honoured as kulapati (chancellor) of the institution. It is said that before him no other sage had received such an honour. He wrote Rigveda Chandanukramani, Rigveda Chandanukramani, Rigveda Rishyanukramani, Rigveda Anuvakanukramani, Rigveda Suktanukramani, Rigveda Kathanukramani, Rigveda Padvidhan, Brihadevata, Shaunak Smriti, Charanvyuh, Rigvidhan.

He taught several notable disciples at his institution. These notable disciples of the Kulpati Shaunaka were Lomaharshana, Ugrashrava, Rishi Asita, Narada, Kapila, Shuracharya, Vishwamitra, Uddalaka, Kahoda, Ashtavakra, Shwetketu, Uddhava, Bhishma, Dronacharya, Vidura, Chyavan, Bharadwaja, etc.

The revered Vedic sage Udara- Śāṇḍilya studied Vedic texts at the institution of Shaunaka Mahashala. He was the disciple of the Kulpati Shaunaka. He learned Udgitha from the Kulpati Shaunaka there.

== Description ==
The location of the Gurukul was Nimisharanya. It is said that Shaunaka performed a 12-year-long Yajna at his ashram, which attracted a large number of learned men, who held incessant discussions about religion and philosophy. He wrote Shaunaka Grihasutra, Shaunaka Grihyaparishit, and Vastushastra Granth. He helped sages Romaharsha and Ugrasrava Sutha to spread the Puranas and Itihasa among a large masses.

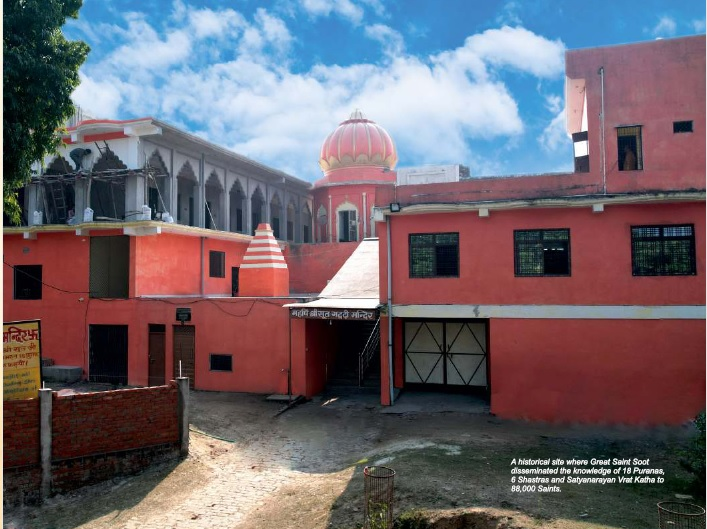
Maharshi Shree Suta Gaddi Mandir - The legendary seat of the Puranas narrator sage Sūta.

Ugrashravas was an auditor at Takshila. He travelled to Naimiṣāraṇya forest. There he met with the sage Shaunaka and a large group of Brahmins studying at the Shaunaka Mahashala. The Shaunaka Mahashala is considered as the ancient form of university in the Indian Subcontinent by scholars. It is also known as Naimishyaranya University. The Brahmin scholars in the ashram asked about Janamejaya's snake sacrifice with the sage Ugrashravas. Then Ugrashravas recited the story of the Mahabharata as recited by Vaishampayana to him with some additional materials. This is the place where Shrimad Bhagavatam was preached. The life of the university is mentioned in Adi Parva of the Mahabharata. The philosophical conversation between the sage Pippalada and the sage Shaunaka at the Shaunaka Mahashala was recorded as Brahma Upanishad or Brahmopanishad.

The Vyasa Gaddi also known as Vyasa Peetha in the premises of the Shaunaka Mahashala, was the seat of the revered Vedic sage Veda Vyasa. He divided the Vedas into four branches. After that he composed and compiled the four branches of the Vedas there. The Vyasa Gaddi was located on a high mound amidst trees groves. The sacred Gomati river flowing through the Naimisharanya forest was clearly visible from the high mound of the Vyasa Peetha.
