= Apurva =

Concept in Hinduism

Apurva in Mimamsa philosophy is the performative element of an injunction that justifies ritualistic acts and their results. As an explanatory concept it serves as a mediator.

== Meaning ==
The Sanskrit word apūrva in its common usage means 'one of a kind', 'unique', 'like none-other', 'like never before' or 'unprecedented', it is something not foreseen, unpreceded, unprecedented, never seen before; in brief it means that which did not exist before or is newly born. Apurva cannot be denoted through any noun or by any verb; it is comprehended as a result of an act.

== Apurva of Hindu philosophy ==
Bhartrhari explains that pravrtti can be viewed in four ways: as apurva, kala-sakti, kriya and kala. Kumarila Bhatta explains that Apurva is the newly known vidhi or that what is not known before hearing a vedic sentence. Salikanatha explains that Apurva is that which is not cognisable by any of the ordinary means of knowledge. And, according to Nagesa, the conclusion that if pravrtti is identified with the universal Dharma it can be properly called Apurva, is the view adopted by Prabhakara who holds that the meaning of verbal endings is karya, and niyoga (obligation) is the very karya that prompts a man to fulfil itself . Karya is apurva or niyama (restriction), apurva is something which has not arisen before the performance of the sacrifice but newly born after it. Niyoga or Apurva is the supersensuous result of an action which later on produces the sensible result or prayojana, the final purpose of the action, Therefore, Apurva is something different from action itself and it is to be understood with regard to its capability of bringing about the heavenly world.

== Implication ==
Sabara in his commentary on Mimamsa Sutra II.1.5 denies that Apurva can be perceived by the senses, and in his commentary on Mimamsa Sutra VI.8.27 explains that ordinary knowledge is different from religious knowledge in as much as the former deals with things and latter, with words, because in ordinary life action is determined by things and not by words, but in Vedic matters, knowledge is gained by words alone. The followers of Mimamsa are of the view that scriptural language lacks an external source and that scriptural language is internalized, but its own epistemological procedure is devoid of any fixed ontology. Originally Apurva had to do with the all too common religious beliefs according to which a reward is given to anyone who strictly adheres to religious obligations and that made Apurva an intervening agency to be presented by the Mimamsa school as a theological tool for solving the discrepancy that may arise between the ritualistic act and its result i.e. an epistemic mechanism that indicates knowledge of casual links between acts and their consequences. Even though the word or term Apurva is not mentioned by Jaimini but is discussed by Sabara in his commentary on Mimamsa Sutras, but Jaimini says there is Codana, the performative element of an injunction, that justifies all religious actions. Sabara explains that by Codana, Jaimini meant Apurva, though Apurva as a link is not empirical in nature, and is ‘the smallest meaning’ related to meaning as a syllable is to a word. Wilhelm Halbfass understands it to be, within well-defined conditions, a conceptual device that is assumed to operate within a kind of closed system in which it seems to be secure against outside interference, that it serves as a mediator, as a conceptual link between the drsta (the visible) and the adrsta (invisible) connecting the empirical spheres of actions and reactions with the religious non-empirical sphere in which lie the values of these actions and reactions. According to Kumarila, Apurva is a particular potentiality or capacity originated by the sacrificial acts located in the soul of the sacrificer who is the performer of Vedic rites, ensuring causal efficacy of those rites even though those Vedic rites are transitional in nature. However, Prabhakara rejects this view and concludes that Apurva resides in actions. But, for both it is an explanatory concept.

== Significance ==
Mimamsikas reject the contention that Apurva is dharma which Nayayikas consider it is. Dharma is what is conveyed by sreyas-sadhana by the Vedas, which particular sadhana does not convey bhavana or volition of the performer. And moreover, Sreyas-sadhana and Apurva are not conveyed by the Sruti, Apurva is by implication understood to be the intermediary cause with sacrifice itself being the instrumental cause. The Vaisesikas hold the view that the Adrshta, also called Apurva, is the cause of the world process. But, there is no proof of Apurva being a pleasure. Adi Shankara rejects the notion that the statement Atmetyevopasita is the primary injunction, Apurva Vidhi, to meditate on Brahman as one’s own Self because Self-knowledge is not an action that can be enjoined. The Later Advaita thinkers, such as Madhusudana, held the view that just like Apurva as a subtle state continues to linger after the sacrifice is over, ignorance remains in the subtle state of avidya even after the dawn of knowledge, and as there is an interval between cause and effect similarly there is an interval between knowledge and body-fall.
