= Varaha Purana =

Sanskrit text from the Puranas genre of literature in Hinduism

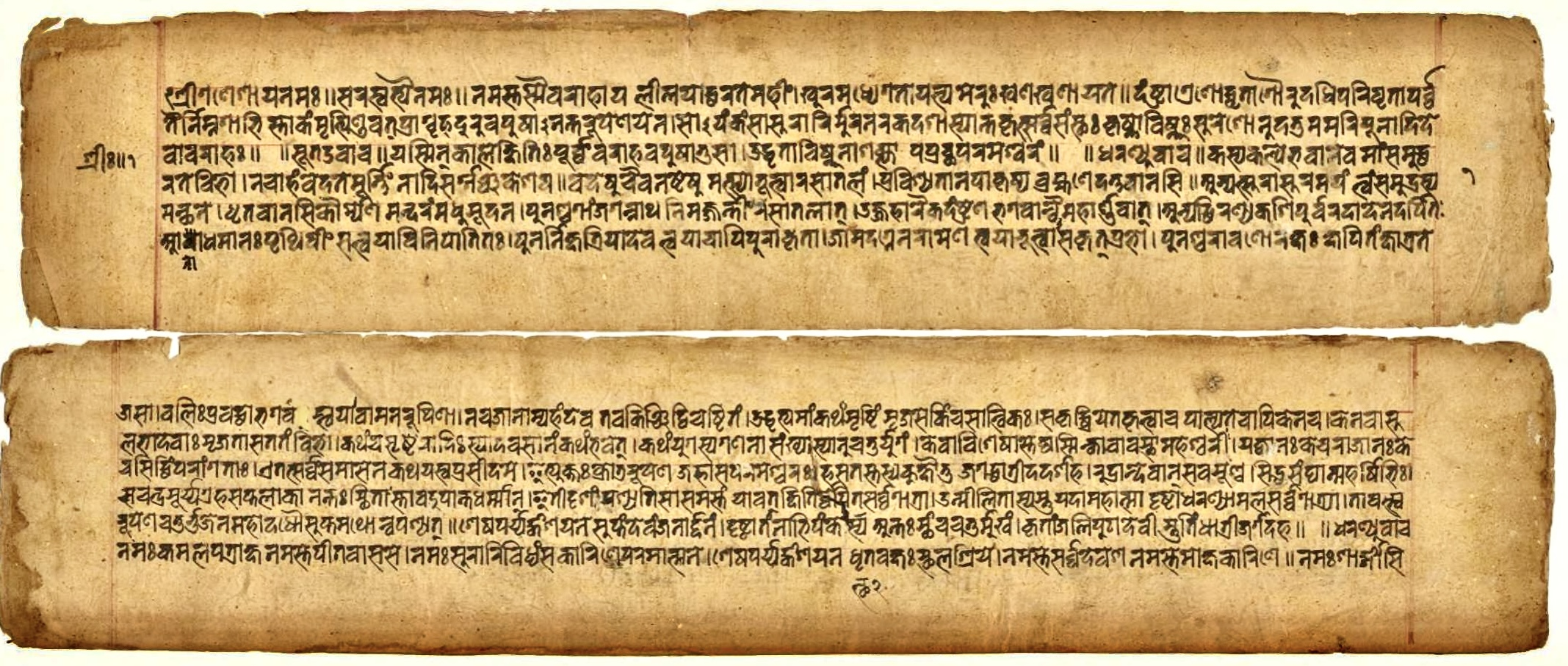
Manuscript of the Varaha Purana, Sanskrit language and Newar script

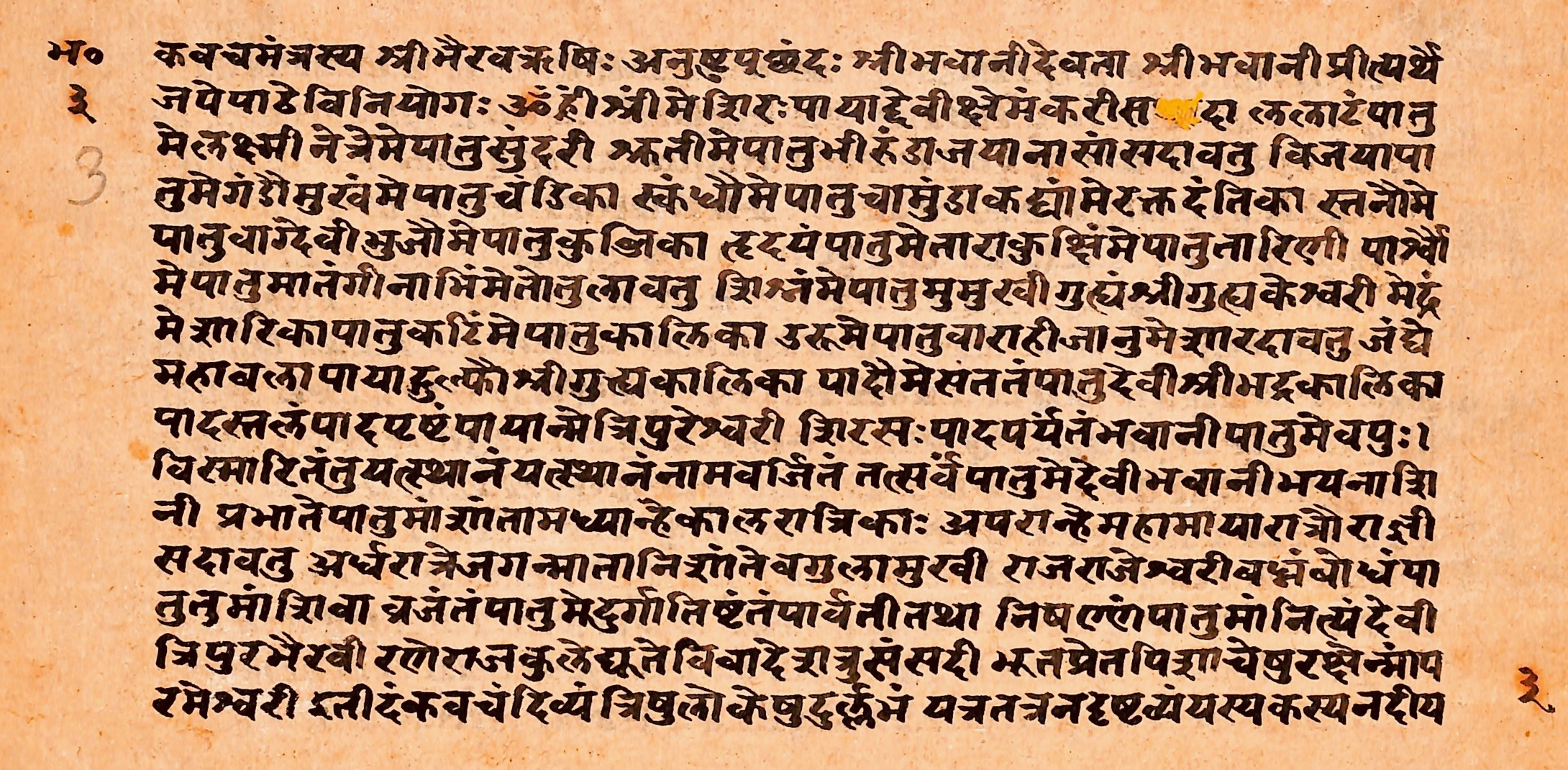
A page from the Varaha Purana (Sanskrit, Devanagari)

The Varaha Purana (Sanskrit: वराह पुराण, Varāha Purāṇa) is a Sanskrit text from the Puranas genre of literature in Hinduism. It belongs to the Vaishnavism literature corpus praising Narayana (Vishnu), but includes chapters dedicated to praising and centered on Shiva and Shakti.

The text exists in many versions, with major sections lost to history. The text has been estimated to have been first completed between the 10th and 12th centuries, and continuously revised thereafter. The surviving manuscripts of this text are notable, like Linga Purana, because they do not cover the required Panchalakshana (five characteristics) expected in a Purana. Scholars have questioned whether it really qualifies as a Purana, and whether the extant manuscripts are merely a religious manual largely focussed on Vaishnava practices, with sections that also praise Shiva, Shakti and other gods in a secular way.

The Varaha Purana includes mythology, particularly of the Varaha incarnation (avatar) of Vishnu rescuing the earth (Prithvi) at the time of a great flood. The text also includes mythology of goddesses and Shiva, and a discussion of Karma and Dharma called Dharmasamhita. A large portion of the text is dedicated to medieval geographic Mahatmya (tourist guides) to temples and sites in Mathura and Nepal, but it lacks adoring Krishna in Mathura-related section of the type found in other Puranas.

== History ==
The century in which Varaha Purana was composed is unknown. Wilson suggested 12th-century, during the period of Ramanuja influence. Most scholars concur that this is a relatively late Purana, and a few suggest that the first version of this text was complete by the 10th century. The text is named after the Varaha (boar) avatar of Vishnu, wherein he rescues goddess earth.

The text is mentioned and summarized in the manuscripts of the Matsya Purana, Skanda Purana and the Agni Purana, but the description of this text in those documents suggests that surviving manuscripts of Varaha Purana are entirely different from what it once was. The text exists in many versions, with significant variations.

The Padma Purana categorizes Varaha Purana as a Sattva Purana. Scholars consider the Sattva-Rajas-Tamas classification as "entirely fanciful" and there is nothing in this text that actually justifies this classification.

== Contents ==
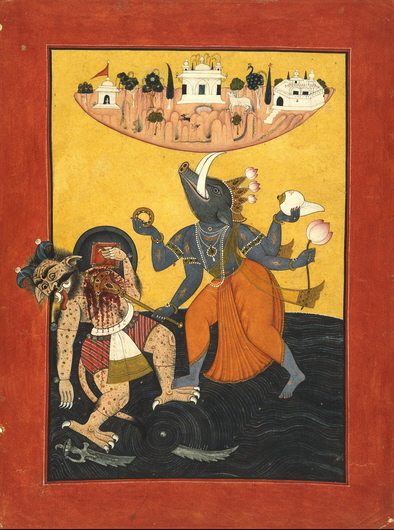
Varaha killing Hiranyaksha and saving Bhumi, 1740 CE, Chamba painting

The printed editions of this work, depending on the version, has 217 or 218 adhyāyas (chapters). The critical edition (edited by Anand Swarup Gupta, and published by the All-India Kashiraj Trust, Varanasi) has 215 chapters. The Hindu tradition and other Puranas claim that this text had 24,000 verses; however, surviving manuscripts have less than half that number.

According to the Narada Purana, this text has two parts: purvabhaga and uttarabhaga. While the contents of the purvabhaga summarized in the Narada text generally correspond to the extant manuscripts of the Varaha Purana, the uttarabhaga summarized in the Narada text is not found in surviving Varaha manuscripts, and presumed lost to history.

According to Rajendra Hazra, the extant text has four distinct sections, differing in interlocutors and general characteristics. These sections were likely composed in different time periods, by different authors.

In the first section (chapters 1 to 112), Suta is the narrator and Varaha and Prithvi are the interlocutors. In the second section (chapters 113 to 192), Suta narrates what was told by Prithvi to Sanatkumara about the dialogue between Varaha and herself. In the third section (chapters 193 to 212), Suta describes the conversation between the king Janamejaya and the sage Vaishampayana. This section is also known as the Dharma Samhita. In the final section (chapters 213 to end), Suta narrates the conversation between Brahma and Sanatkumara.

== See also ==
- Bhagavata Purana
- Vishnu Purana
- Shiva Purana
- Markandeya Purana
