= Sūta =

Bards of Puranic stories; Indian caste

Sūta (Sanskrit: सूत) refers both to the bards of Hindu Puranic stories and to a mixed caste. According to Manu Smriti (10.11.17), the sūta caste are children of a Kshatriya father and a Brahmin mother. And the narrator of several of the Puranas, Ugrasrava Sauti, son of Romaharshana, was also called Sūta. Authorities are divided on whether the bards were members of the sūta caste. Ludo Rocher points out that the use of sūta as a caste may have been separate from the earlier use of sūta to describe Romaharshana and his son Ugrasrava Sauti. R. N. Dandekar states that the sūta caste is different from the narrator of the Puranas.

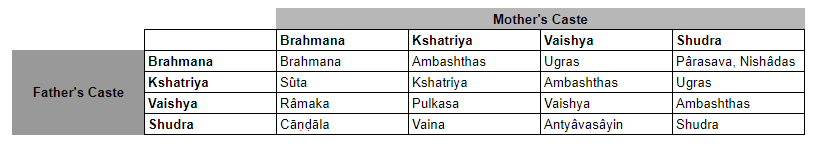

"Brāhmaṇyāṁ kṣatriyātsūtō prātilōmyēna jāyatē. Gajabandhanamaśvānāṁ vāhanaṁ karma sārathēḥ.29. Vaiśyadharmēṣu sūtasya adhikāraḥ kvacidbhavēt. Jātivi0 – kṣatriyāṇāmasau dharma kartumar'hatyaśēṣataḥ. Kin̄cica kṣatrajātibhyō n'yūnatā tasya jāyatē ॥ ३० ॥"

"In Brahmin women, suta caste is born out of pratilomata marriage by kshatriyas. Elephant keeping and charioteer is their livelihood, they has no right in Vaishyadharma. It is written in "Jati Vivek" that they can do all duties of Kshatriyas, but it is a little less than the Kshatriya caste, it is the twelfth".॥ 29 ॥ 30 ॥ Jatibhaskara

Sūta is also mentioned as a class of people in the epic Mahābhārata, often charioteers. The foster-parents of Karna, a character of Kurukshetra War, were Sūtas. Hence, Karna too was considered a Sūta. Kichaka, the commander of Matsya army, was a Sūta.
