= Suta Gaddi =

Seat of Suta Goswami

- सूत गद्दी
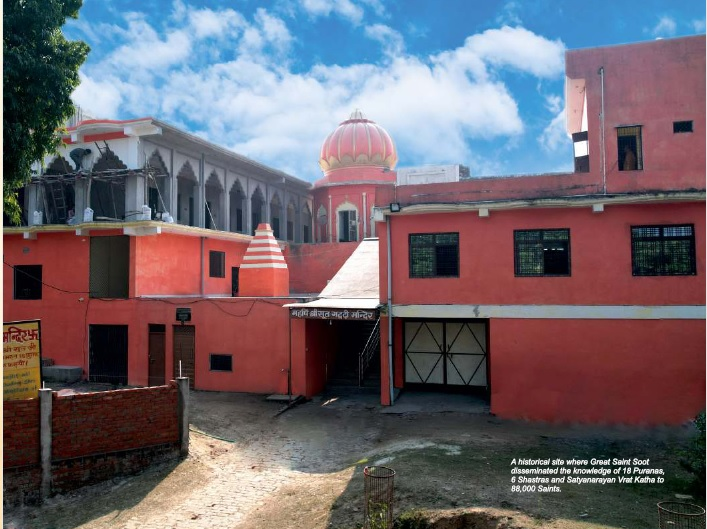
- View of the Suta Gaddi Mandir at the legendary site.

Religion
- Affiliation: Hinduism
- District: Sitapur

Location
- Location: Naimisharanya
- State: Uttar Pradesh
- Country: India
- Interactive map of Suta Gaddi
- Coordinates: 27.3490674°N 80.4881174°E

Architecture
- Established: Vedic age

Suta Gaddi (Devanagari: सूत गद्दी) or Sutta Gaddi or Soot Gaddi refers to the legendary place at the Shaunaka Mahashala, where the sage Suta Goswami narrated the 18 Puranas to 88 thousand sages in the campus. It was located at the bank of the holy river Gomati in Naimisharanaya, a sacred forest in Hinduism. Presently, there is a temple of worship on the site known as Suta Gaddi Mandir. It is a famous temple for Hindu pilgrimage arriving in the holy city of Naimisharanaya. It is situated near the other holy sites of the Chakra Teertha and the Vyasa Peetha in the city.

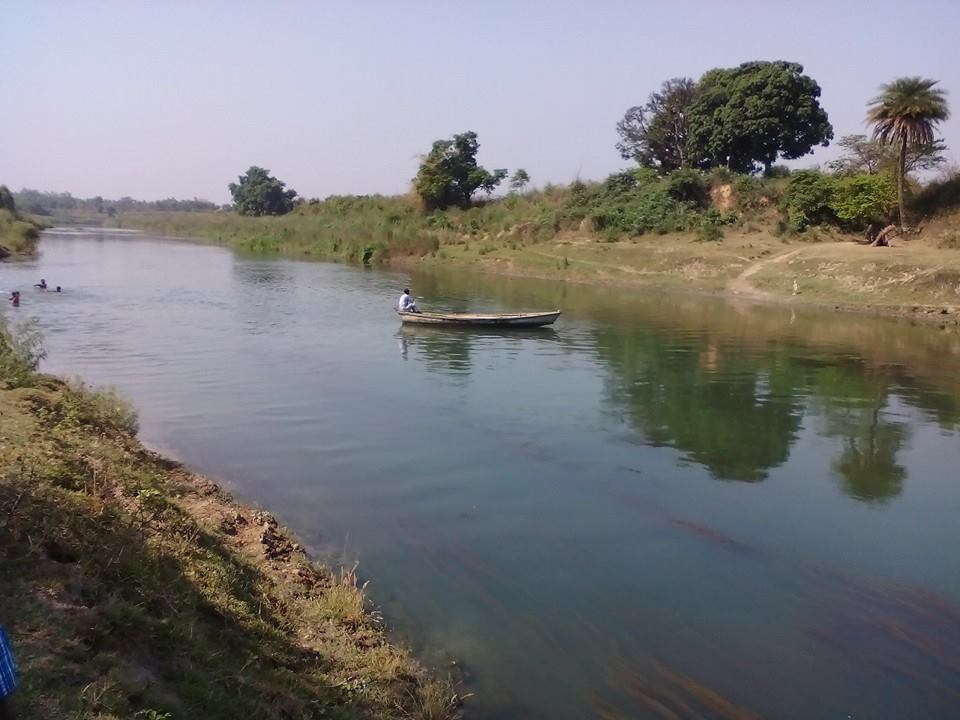
View of the Gomati river near the legendary forest of Naimisharanya.

== Description ==
According to the Puranas, Suta or Soota was a community of mixed class between Kshatriya and Brahmin. This community was evolved from a Kshatriya father and a Brahmin mother.

Lomaharshana also called as Romaharshana was the first Suta, who sit on the Suta Gaddi and recited the Puranas to the assembly of sages around it. He was the disciple of the great and revered Vedic sage Veda Vyasa.

Later, he was mistakenly killed by Lord Balarama during his visit in the Naimisharanya forest. According to Puranas, the seat of Suta Lomaharshana was higher that of the Brahmanas in the assembly. Once, when Lord Balarama came to the Naimisharanya forest for pilgrimage, he also took a visit at the assembly of the sages in the premises of the Shaunaka Mahashala. When he arrived at the assembly, all the Brahmanas stood up to receive him. But the Suta Lomaharshana didn't leave his seat. Lord Balarama felt disrespect from the act of Lomaharshana and became angry. Then, he angrily cut the head of Lomaharshana and killed him. After the death of the Suta Lomaharshana, his son Ugrashravas was called from Takshila and was appointed as the next Suta at institution of Shaunaka Mahashala in Naimisharanya. Then, the next Suta Ugrashravas recited the Puranas to the assembly of sages there.

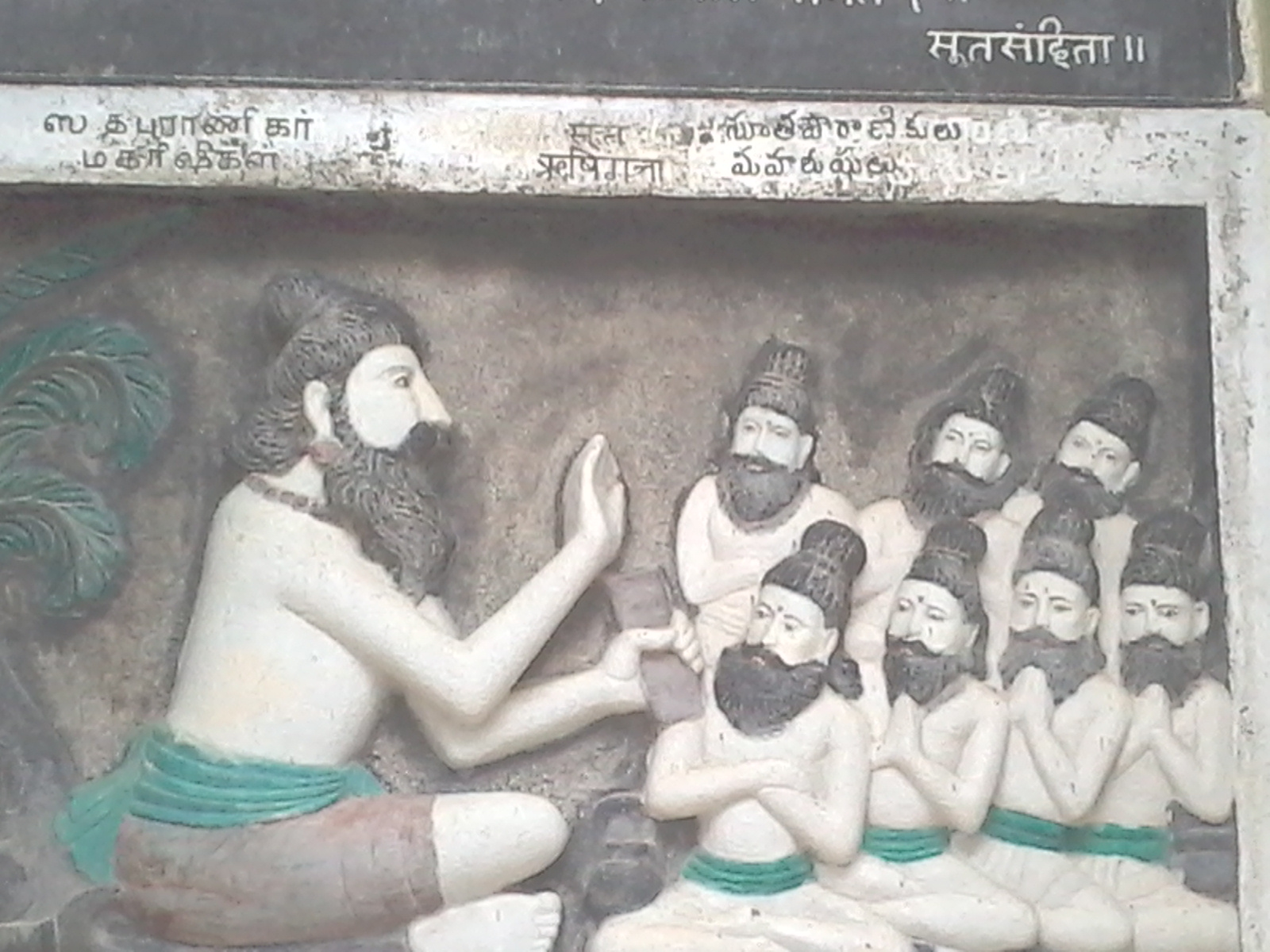
Depiction of the tradition of the Suta Gaddi at the wall of the Shankara Matha in Rameshwaram.
