= Bashkala =

Bashkala could refer to:

- Bashkala, another name for Başkale, a city in southeastern Turkey
- Bashkala, one of the two surviving shakhas of the Rigveda
- Bāṣkali, a Vedic saint in ancient India
