= Bṛhaddevatā =

Metrical Sanskrit work

The Bṛhaddevatā (Sanskrit: बृहद्देवता), is a metrical Sanskrit work, traditionally ascribed to Shaunaka. It is an enlarged catalogue of the Rigvedic deities worshipped in the individual suktas (hymns) of the Rigveda. It also contains the myths and legends related to the composition of these suktas.

== Recensions ==
The extant manuscripts of this text are found in two recensions, the shorter and the longer. The shorter recension contains 1091 verses, of which 18 verses are not found in the longer one. Similarly, the longer recension has 1206 verses, of which 133 verses are not found in the shorter recension. A modern British scholar, A. A. Macdonell concluded that the original size of the work was retained in the longer recension and that the shorter version was an abridgement of it. Macdonnell placed the text before 400 BCE. But, in 1979, a Japanese scholar, Muneo Tokunaga questioned all conclusions of Macdonnell. He assumed the existence of a series of three scribes, who successively interpolated material onto the "core" text. According to him, this "core" text was Shaunaka's Devatanukramani, which is no longer extant. The first expanded version of the Brihaddevata was its shorter recension, which was composed between 1st-5th centuries CE and the second expanded version of the Brihaddevata was its longer recension, which was composed between 7th-11th centuries CE. This also explains its name, which could originally have been Brihaddevatanukramani (an expanded index of the deities).

Indologist Karel Werner puts its date of composition to 5th-century BCE.

Stephanie Jamison and Joel Brereton place the compilation of Śaunaka's works (including the Bṛhaddevatā and early anukramaṇīs) around the mid-first millennium BCE.

== Editions ==
The first printed edition of this text was edited by Rajendralala Mitra. It was published by the Asiatic Society, Calcutta as a part of their Bibliotheca Indica series in 1892. According to A. A. Macdonell, this edition had a large number of misprints. It also consisted many impossible readings taken from incorrect manuscripts, omissions of lines, repetitions of lines and insertions of undoubtedly spurious lines. It was based on seven manuscripts. A. A. Macdonell produced a critical edition with an exhaustive introduction in English, seven appendices and a translation into English in two parts, published in 1904. This edition is based on nine manuscripts, as well as Rajendralala Mitra's edition. A new critical edition, by Muneo Tokunaga, of the text was published in 1997.

== Contents ==
The work consists eight adhyayas (chapters), mostly written in Anuṣṭubh meter, though a number of verses are in Triṣṭubh meter also. Each adhyaya comprises about 30 vargas, each consisting of five verses. The text begins with a long introduction embracing the complete first adhyaya, and twenty-five vargas of the second. The main body of the text beginning from the twenty-sixth varga of the second adhyaya, for the most part, is concerned with stating the deities, in their successive order, for the hymns and stanzas of the Rigveda. It also comprises nearly forty legends, described to explain the circumstances under which the hymns they are concerned with were composed. These legends cover almost a quarter of the whole text. A number of these legends are historically connected to the Mahabharata.
