= Vidhāna =

Vidhāna is a genre of texts dealing with the use of Vedic mantras outside of Vedic sacrifices to attain various ends.

== Texts ==
Except for the Atharva Veda, there is a Vidhāna text for each Veda, namely the Ṛg Vidhāna, the Yajur Vidhāna, and the Sāma Vidhāna. M. S. Bhat dates the composition of these texts to between 500 and 300 BCE, with the Ṛg Vidhāna being the oldest. In addition to these three texts, chapters dedicated to the Ṛg, Sāma, Yajur, and Atharva Vidhāna also appear in the Viṣṇudharmottara Purāṇa (Khanda II, chapters 124–127) and the Agni Purāṇa (chapters 259–262); most of these are likely based on homonymous works that have not survived. The Ṛg Vidhāna is also followed up by works with titles such as Ṛgvidhānakārikā, Ṛgvidhānasaṁkṣepa, and Ṛgvidhi; these are likely late compendia.

=== Ṛg Vidhāna ===
The oldest of Vidhāna texts, Ṛg Vidhāna, composed in mixed Śloka and Triṣṭubh metres, is attributed to Śaunaka. The text, in the earlier, shorter recension, consists of four adhyāyas, or chapters. A commentary on the text, entitled Ṛgvidhāna-pada-pañcikā, by Mātṛsūnu, is extant.

=== Sāma Vidhāna ===
The Sāmavidhāna-brāhmaṇa, or simply the Sāma Vidhāna, is, despite its name, not properly a Brāhmaṇa text, but belongs to the Vidhāna literature. It consists of three prapāṭhakas and was commented upon by Sāyaṇa.

=== Yajur Vidhāna ===
The Śuklayajurvidhānasūtra is ascribed to Kātyāyana and consists of seven adhyāyas in the best preserved recension of the text; an earlier edition of the text was designated as Yajurvidhāna-śikṣā and was included among the Śikṣā texts. A commentary entitled Yajurmañjarī was written on the text by Mahārāja Mahībhuj, with the assistance of Kālanātha-bhaṭṭa.
