= Artabhaga =

Vedic scholar at Ancient Mithila University

- आर्तभाग

Personal life
- Parent: Ṛtabhāga (father)
- Era: Later Vedic Period
- Education: Ancient Mithila University
- Other name: Jaratkarava Artabhaga
- Occupation: Philosopher, Vedic Scholar

Religious life
- Religion: Sanatana Hinduism

Artabhaga (Sanskrit: आर्तभाग, Romanised:Ārtabhāga) was an Indian philosopher who participated in the Bahudakshina Yajna organised by the King Janaka of Mithila at his court. He was a Vedic sage in the line of Jaratkāru.

== Early life ==
Artabhaga was the son of Ṛtabhāga.

== Description ==
Artabhaga was the second Brahmin scholar in the Bahudakshina Yajna organised at the court of King Kriti Janaka in Mithila, who debated and asked questions to the sage Yajnavalkya. The dialogues between the Brahmins Artabhaga and Yajnavalkya is known as Yajnavalkya - Artabhaga Samvada or Yajnavalkya - Artabhaga Shastrartha. This dialogue is recorded in the Brihadaranyaka Upanishad.

When the first opponent Ashvala asked some questions on the topics of the Vedic philosophy to the sage Yajnavalkya and got answers of all the questions from the sage Yajnavalkya, then he kept quiet and became silent. After that it was Artabhaga who started Shastrartha with the sage Yajnavalkya. Artabhaga also asked many questions with the sage Yajnavalkya related to the Vedic philosophy but was unable to defeat him. The sage Yajnavalkya answered all questions inquired by Artabhaga.

== Yajnavalkya - Artabhaga Shastrartha ==
The core topics of the Artabhaga - Yajnavalkya Shastrartha were Grahas and Atigrahas. In the Shastrartha, Artabhaga first asked the number of Grahas and Atigrahas with the sage Yajnavalkya. Then Yajnavalkya replied that there are eight Grahas and eight Atigrahas. He further mentioned and explained each Grahas and its Atigrahas in the Shastrartha, when it was inquired by Artabhaga. The first Graha he mentioned was Prāṇa, that is nose, which is controlled by the Atigraha of Apāna, that is odour. The term Apāna means the air we breathe. The second Graha is Vāgvai, that is organ of speech, which is controlled by the Atigraha of "Name", that is utterance. The third graha is Jihvā, that is tongue, which is controlled by the Atigraha of taste. The fourth graha is cakśu, that is eyes, which is controlled by the Atigraha of colour. The fifth graha is Śrotraṃ, that is ear, which is controlled by the Atigraha of sound. The sixth graha is Mano, that is mind, which is controlled by the Atigraha of desire. Similarly the seventh graha is Hastau, that is hand, which is controlled by the Atigraha of work. And the last and eighth graha is Tvagvai, that is skin, which is controlled by the Atigraha of touch.

After that Artabhaga in his next question inquired about the death of death.
