= Ashvala =

Chief Hotra priest at the court of the king Janaka

Acharya Ashvala

Personal life
- Children: Kausalya
- Era: Contemporary to Veda Vyasa and Paila (Rishi)
- Region: Mithila region
- Main interest: Vedas
- Education: Ancient Mithila University
- Known for: Debate with the sage Yajnavalkya
- Occupation: Chief Priest

Religious life
- Religion: Hinduism
- School: Rigaveda
- Profession: Teacher, Rishi

Religious career
- Teacher: Parashara
- Chief Hotra Brahmin priest at the Court of King Janaka in Mithila in the Sanatana tradition

Ashvala (Sanskrit: अश्वल) was the chief Hotra Brahmin priest at the court of the King Kriti Janaka in Mithila. He was the authority at the Asvamedha Yajna organised by the king Janaka in which the Brahmins of the Kurus and Panchalas were invited. He is mentioned in the texts Brihadaranyaka Upanishad and Satapatha Brahmana.

== Description ==
Ashvala was one of the eight Brahmins who took part in the Shastrartha against the sage Yajnavalkya in the Bahudakshina Yajna organised by the king Janaka at his court. He was the first Brahmin to question the sage Yajnavalkya in the Shastrartha. He asked Yajnavalkya, "Are you really the best Vedic scholar Brahmistha among us?" Then Yajnavalkya replied that he bowed down to the best Vedic scholar Brahmistha. He further said that he had requirement of the milk giving cows in his ashram so he ordered his disciple Sāmaśravas to drove away the cows. In the Shastrartha, Yajnavalkya answered all the questions asked by Ashvala. After him, Artabhaga was the second Brahmin who debated with the sage Yajnavalkya.

According to the text Prashnopanishad, the name of the son of Ashvala was Kausalya. He was the disciple of the sage Pippalada.

== Ashvala - Yajnavalkya Shastrartha ==
The philosophical debate between the Hotra priest Ashvala and the sage Yajnavalkya at the court of the king Janaka in Mithila is known Ashvala - Yajnavalkya Shastrartha.

In the Shastrartha, the priest Ashvala asked the first question about the way for a sacrificer to get rid from the death. He inquired "By what means a sacrificer go beyond the clutches of the death". Yajnavalkya replied that the sacrificer could go beyond the clutches of death through his organ of speech. "The organ of speech is fire and this fire is the real priest called Hotra. This fire is liberation and this liberation is the salvation of sacrificer from the clutches of death".

In the second question, Ashvala inquired that by what means the sacrificer would go beyond the clutches of day and night. Then Yajnavalkya replied that the sacrificer could go beyond the clutches of day and night through the eye. "The eye is the sun which is the real priest Adhvaryu. He said this sun is liberation and this liberation is the salvation of sacrificer from the clutches of day and night".

In the third question, Ashvala inquired that by what means the sacrificer would go beyond the clutches of bright and dark fortnights. Then Yajnavalkya replied that the sacrificer could go beyond the clutches of bright and dark fortnights through the Vayu. "The Vayu is the vital or life force which is the real priest Udgātṛ. He said this vital force is liberation and this liberation is the salvation of sacrificer from the clutches of bright and dark fortnights".

In the fourth question, Ashvala inquired that since the sky is as if without support, then by what support the sacrificer would go to heaven. Then Yajnavalkya replied that the sacrificer could go to heaven through the mind. The mind is the moon which is the real priest Brahman. He said this moon is liberation and this liberation is the salvation of the sacrificer.
