= Sumantu =

Compiler sage of Dharmasutra.

Acharya Sumantu
- सुमन्तु

Personal life
- Education: Vyasa Peetha
- Known for: Compiler of Atharva Samhita

Religious life
- Religion: Hinduism
- School: Atharva Veda

Religious career
- Disciple of: Veda Vyasa
- Disciples: Kabandha

Sumantu (Sanskrit: सुमन्तु) was a Vedic Rishi in the ancient Indian subcontinent. He was one of the four major disciples of the revered Vedic sage Veda Vyasa. He was taught the Atharvan of the Vedas. The revered sage Veda Vyasa entrusted the responsibility of promotion of the Atharva Veda to his disciple Sumantu. He belongs to the Atharvan tradition of the Vedas. He arranged the knowledge of the Atharvan and compiled its Samhita. It is known as Atharva Samhita. He taught and transmitted his knowledge of the Atharva Veda to his disciple Kabandha. He imparted his Atharva Samhita to his disciple Kabandha. He was also an author of a Dharmasutra text in the Vedic tradition. It is known was Sumantu Dharmasutra.

According to Puranas, the Kuru King Shatanika went to the sage Sumantu for a long discussion, on the advice of Veda Vyasa. During his visit, a long interlocution happened between the King Shatanika and the sage Sumantu, which forms the substance of the text Bhavishya Purana.

== Early life ==
Sumantu was born in the family of a learned Brahmin. His father was the revered Vedic sage Jaimini.
