= Bāṣkali =

Vedic sage and guru

Bāṣkali (Bashkali) also known as Bahkali or Bahkala, was one of the arrangers of the Vedas. Paila divided the Rig Veda, and gave the two Sanhitas, or collections of hymns, to Indrapramati and to Bāṣkali.

== Further sources ==
- Vedabase
- Academia.edu - Rig Veda
