= Jaimini =

Ancient Indian sage, scholar, and Hindu philosopher

- Born: ~ 400 to 200 BCE

Philosophical work
- School: Mimamsa
- Main interests: Ethics; Hermeneutics; Language; Rituals; Linguistics

Jaimini was an ancient Indian scholar who founded the Mīmāṃsā school of Hindu philosophy. He is the son of Parāśara and is considered to be a disciple of sage Vyasa. Traditionally attributed to be the author of the Mimamsa Sutras and the Jaimini Sutras, he is estimated to have lived around 4th to 2nd century BCE. His school is considered non-theistic, but emphasizes ritual parts of the Vedas as essential to dharma. Jaimini is known for his studies of the older Vedic rituals.

Jaimini's guru was Badarayana, who founded the Vedanta school of Hindu philosophy. He is also credited with authoring the Brahma Sutras. Both Badarayana and Jaimini quoted each other as they analyzed each other's theories. Badarayana emphasises knowledge, while Jaimini emphasises rituals. They sometimes agree with each other, sometimes disagree, and often present antithesis to each other.

Jaimini's contributions to textual analysis and exegesis influenced other schools of Indian philosophies. The most studied bhashya (reviews and commentaries) on Jaimini's texts were written by scholars named Shabara, Kumarila, and Prabhakara.

== Works ==
Jaimini's Mimamsa emerged in a time when traditional Vedic beliefs were losing their persuasive power. It was no longer taken for granted that sacrifices pleased deities, maintained the universe, or that the Vedas were infallible. Buddhist, Jain, and skeptical perspectives questioned the significance of sacrifices, while some adherents continued their practice despite doubts. This challenged the notion of a comprehensive understanding of rituals. In his works, Jaimini sought to address these criticisms.

=== Purva Mimamsa Sutras ===
Jaimini is most known for his great treatise Purva Mimamsa Sutras, also called Karma-mimamsa (“Study of Ritual Action”), a system that investigates the rituals in the Vedic texts. The text founded the Purva-Mimamsa (Mimamsa) school of Indian philosophy, one of the six Darsanas or schools of Indian philosophy.

Dated to around the 4th century BCE, the text contains about 3,000 sutras and is the foundational text of the Mimamsa school. The text aims at an exegesis of the Vedas with regard to ritual practice (karma) and religious duty (dharma), commenting on the early Upanishads. Jaimini's Mimamsa is eminently ritualist (karma-kanda) in comparison to the metaphysical focus on knowledge of the Self (Atman) and Brahman of the Vedanta philosophy. His Mimamsa Sutra was commented upon by many, of which Śābara was among the earliest.

=== Jaimini Bharata ===
Jaimini also wrote a version of the Mahabharata narrated to him by his preceptor Vyasa, but today, only the Ashvamedhika Parva and the Shasramukhacaritam of his work are available. His version of the Mahabharata is titled Jaimini Bharata. It was translated into English in 2 volumes along with the Mairavanacaritam by the retired Brigadier General Shekhar Kumar Sen and Dr. Pradeep Bhattachaarya who is also the editor of the translation.

Jaimini's Mahabharata is different from Vyasa's because it is more focused on Yuddhishthira's Ashwamedha and the reconstruction of peace between the children of enemies such as Karna, Jayadratha, and Shakuni. It also emphasizes the value of worshipping Krishna as an avatar of Vishnu. Jaimini Bharata is also known as Jaimini-ashwamedha.

== Other mentions ==
=== Samaveda ===
When sage Veda Vyasa classified ancient Vedic hymns into four parts based on their use in sacrificial rites and taught them to his four chief disciples – Paila, Vaisampayana, Jaimini, and Sumantu, the Samaveda was transmitted to sage Jaimini.

He classified the Veda into four, namely Rig, Yajur, Sama and Atharva. The histories and the Puranas are said to be the fifth Veda.

— Brahmanda Purana 1.4.21

=== Markandeya Purana ===
One of the major Puranas, the Markandeya Purana, opens with a dialogue between sage Jaimini and Markandeya and discusses philosophy, theology, cosmology, cosmogony, dharma, and karma.

=== Brahmanda Purana ===
It is mentioned in the first chapter of the Brahmanda Purana that the Brahmanda Purana is a story that Jaimini is telling King Hiranyanabha at Naimisharanya.

=== Mahabharata ===
Jaimini has also appears in many parts of the Mahabharata. For instance, in Adi Parva, chapter 53, stanza 6, Jaimini is said to be present during Janamejaya's sarpasatra, the yagna (sacrificial ritual) he performed to kill all serpents out of vengeance for his father Parikshit's death. Furthermore, stanza 11 in chapter 4 of the Sabha Parva says that Jaimini was a part of Yudhishthira's council. He even visited Bhishma as he lay on the bed of arrows during the war, according to Shanti Parva, chapter 46, stanza 7.

=== Later narratives ===
In later narratives, Jaimini is described as a disciple of Vyasa, the author of the Mahabharata, who seeks clarification on the Mahabharata. Since Vyasa was not around to clear his confusions, he went to Markandeya. However, by the time he went to him, Markandeya had abandoned speech. The disciples of Markandeya directed Jaimini to four birds who had witnessed the great eighteen-day Mahabharata war. The mother of those four birds was flying above the battlefield of the great war when she was pierced by an arrow which ripped open her womb. Four eggs fell out and safely landed onto the Kurukshetra ground, which had been softened as it was blood-soaked. An elephant's bell fell on the four birds and covered them protectively, keeping the eggs safe throughout the remainder of the war. After the war, they were discovered by rishis who realized that the four birds had heard much during the war and had knowledge that no other human had so blessed them with human speech. Jaimini went to those four birds and was able to clear his doubts and confusions.

== See also ==
- Purva Mimamsa Sutras
- Samaveda
- Guru Purnima
- Indian Mathematics
