= Naimiṣāraṇya (forest) =

Sacred forest in Hindu literature

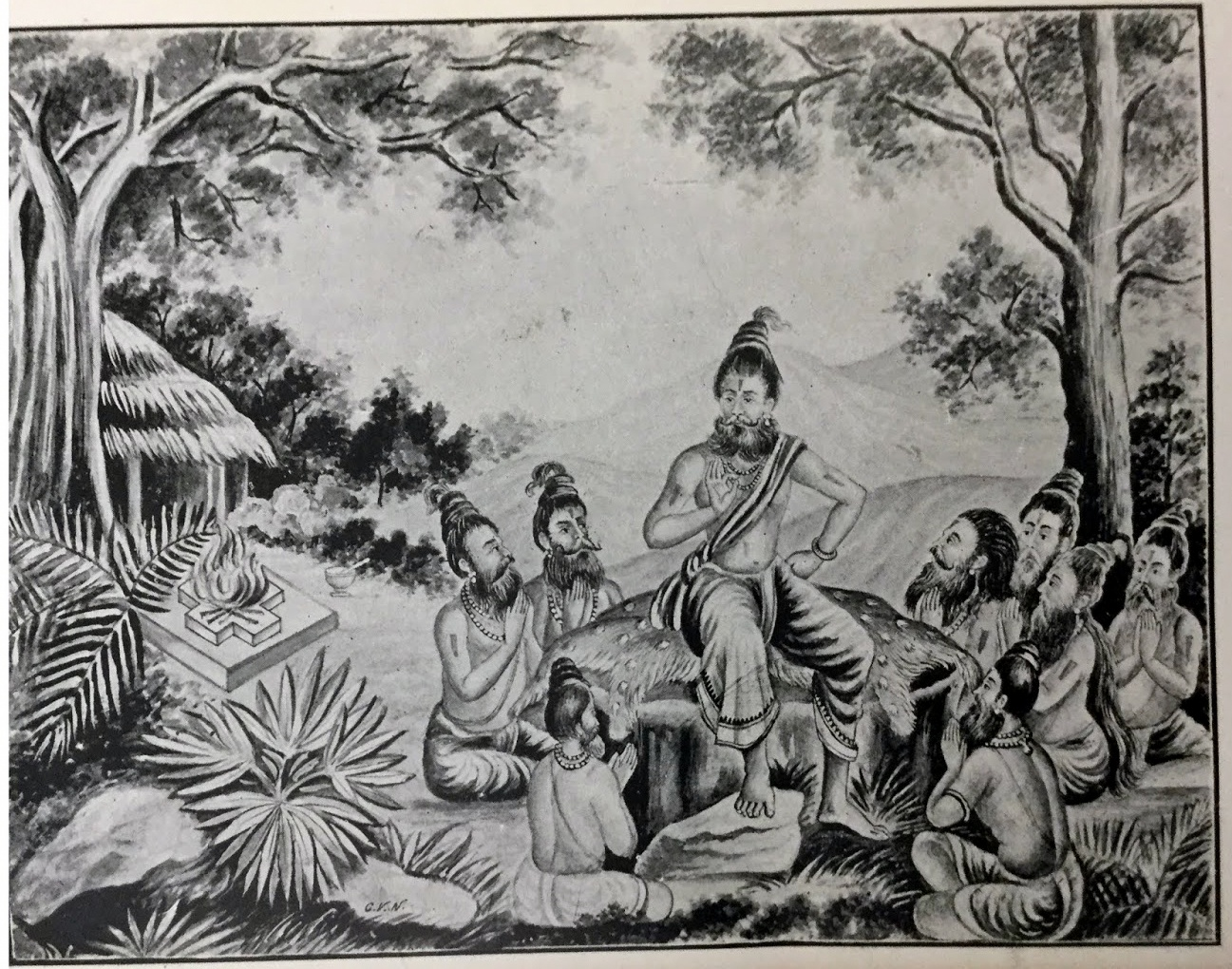
Shuka addresses a number of sages, Naimisaranya, Bhagavata Purana.

Naimiṣāraṇya (Sanskrit: नैमिषारण्य, romanized: Naimiṣāraṇya, lit. 'Naimisha forest'), also referred as Naimisha (Sanskrit: नैमिष) or Nimkhårvan is a sacred forest frequently mentioned in Puranic literature, as well as both the Ramayana and the Mahabharata. It is regarded to be the place where the Puranas had been narrated for the first time, before a large gathering of sages. The ancient forest corresponds to modern day Nimsar, situated along the Gomati river in the Sitapur district of Uttar Pradesh, India.

== Etymology ==
The Brahmanas derive the name Naimiṣāraṇya from 'nimiṣā', "a twinkling of the eye"; hence Naimiṣāraṇya means "a forest or pool where in the twinkling of an eye sage Gauramukha destroyed an army of Asuras." Naimiṣīyā figure for the first time in the Brāhmaṇas and the Upaniṣadic Literature. These words denote the dwellers in the Naimiṣa forest. They are mentioned in the Kāthaka-Saṃhitā and Brāhmaṇas being clearly of special sanctity. According to some legends of Puranas, the name Naimisharanya originates from the name of the Videha's King Nimi. It is believed to be the tapsya sthal (penance place) of the King Nimi of Videha.

In the Varaha Purana, it has been described as the region where the daityas (a clan of asuras) were slain within a nimiśa (smallest unit of time), and the place was made an abode of peace.

== Legend ==
=== Ramayana ===
According to the Rāmāyaṇa, Naimiṣa was situated along the Gomati river. The sanctity attached to the place was such that Rāma desired to celebrate Aśvamedha sacrifice in this forest, and accordingly, placing his younger brother Lakṣmana assisted by the priests in charge of the steed, himself went to the forest. It was during the sacrifice that Valmiki with his disciples came there and constructed some comfortable huts at a distance. Then Lava and Kuśa recited the whole Ramayana, which convinced Rama that they were the twin sons of Sītā. Ultimately, Bhumi appeared at Sita's invocation and, proving her innocence, accompanied her into the bowels of the earth.

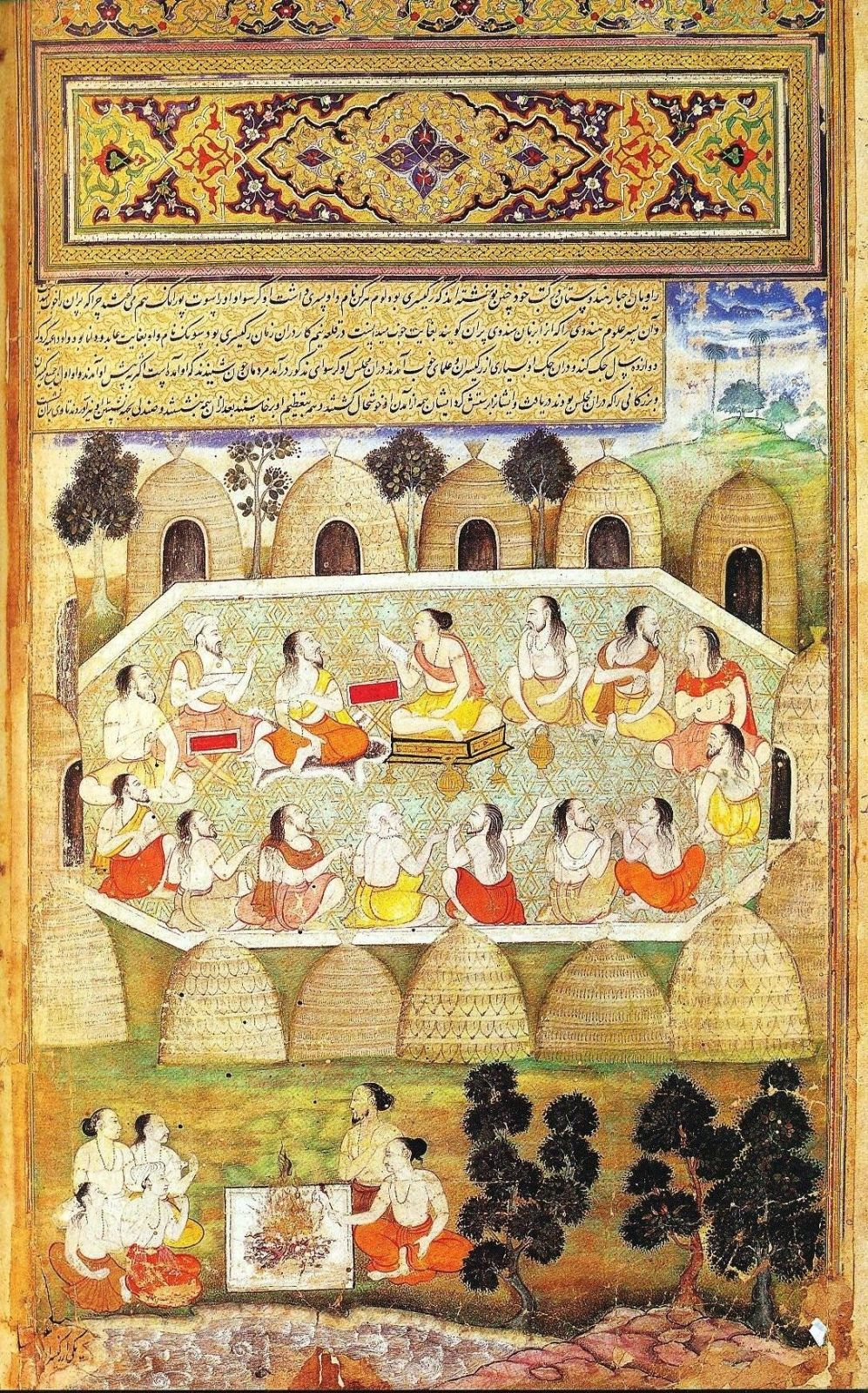
Shaunaka recites the Mahabharata at the Naimisaranya forest.

=== Mahabharata ===
In the Adi Parva of the Mahabharata, the forest is mentioned as situated towards east (prācīm diśam) of the mountain regions of Himavat which contained many sacred spots. In the epic, there are frequent references to Ṛṣis living in Naimiṣāraṇya and performing sacrifices extending for years.

Here Śaunaka had performed a twelve years sacrifice which was attended by a large number of seers, of whom the most prominent and distinguished was Ugraśrava-Sauti, the son of Romaharṣaṇa. His personality attracts the attention of all the scholars of Indian culture. He is described as well-versed in the Purāṇas which he cultivated with meticulous devotion. Sauti's father Romaharṣaṇa who was a disciple of the great Kṛṣṇa-Dvaipāyana Vyāsa, had once narrated the story of Āstīka before the inhabitants of the forest at the latter's request.

It is also believed that the river Sarasvatī had turned her course towards the east to see the great Ṛṣis (sages) dwelling in the forest.

== See also ==
- Naimisaranya, a temple located at the purported site of Naimisha forest
- Valmiki Samhita, an important work for the worship of Lord Rama and Sita
- Tirtha Prabandha written by Vadiraja swami
- Shandilya Ashram
- Shaunaka Mahashala
- Vyasa Peetha
- Suta Gaddi

== Bibliography ==
- Pandeya, Rajendra Bihari. “Naimiṣāraṇya in Literature.” Journal of the American Oriental Society, vol. 84, no. 4, 1964, pp. 405–408. JSTOR.
