= Shaunaka =

Sage in Hinduism

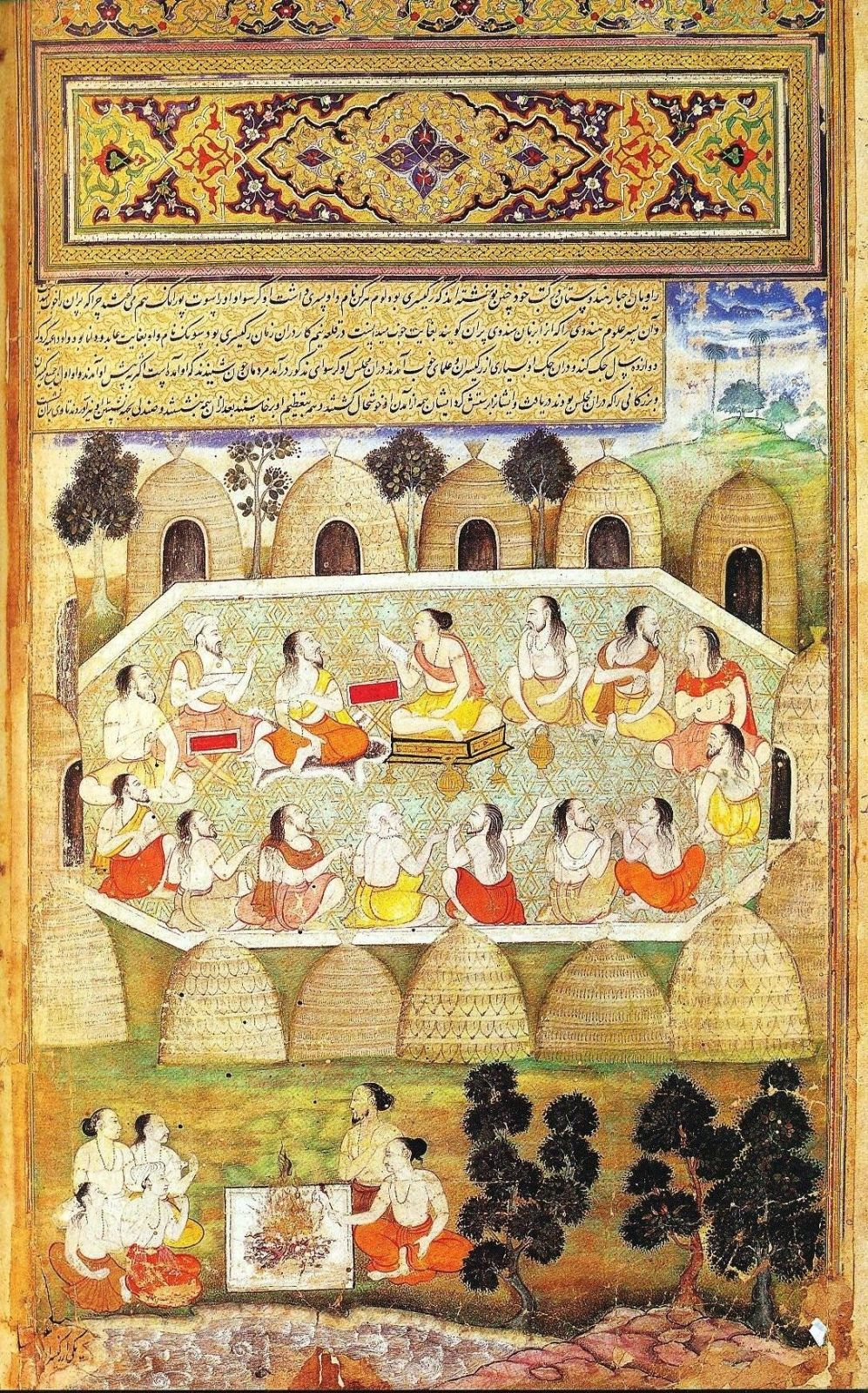
- Shaunaka recites the Mahabharata, a Mughal painting
- Associate: Shaunaka Mahashala
- Texts: Rigveda, Mahabharata

Shaunaka (Sanskrit: शौनक, IAST: śaunaka) is the name applied to teachers, and to a Shakha of the Atharvaveda. It is especially the name of a celebrated Sanskrit grammarian, author of the Ṛgveda-Prātiśākhya, the Bṛhaddevatā, the Caraṇa-vyūha, six Anukramaṇīs (indices) to the Rigveda, and the Vidhāna of the Rigveda. He is the teacher of Katyayana and Ashvalayana and is said to have combined the Bashkala and Shakala Shakhas of the Rigveda. In the Mahabarata, he is identified as the son of Ruru and Pramadvara, and in the Bhagavata Purana, he is identified as the grandson of Gritsamada and son of Sunaka, who belongs to the Bhrigu dynasty.

== Literature ==
According to the Vishnu Purana, Shaunaka was the son of Gritsamada and invented the system of the four levels of human life. Sūta mahamuni narrated mythological stories to a group of sages headed by Shaunaka maha muni.

According to Vishnumitra of Champa town, the commentator of Uvaṭa's commentary of Ṛgveda-Prātiśākhya, Ṛgveda-Prātiśākhya is attributed to Shaunaka who taught it to others in a satra-yajna (a 12-day very large scale collective yajna) held in Naimisha.

The Ṛgvidhāna, a Vidhāna text on the use of Rigvedic mantras, is also attributed to Shaunaka. The Vidhana which he wrote helped simplify the rites and rituals written in the Shrauta and Gruhya shastras (scriptures).

Shaunaka had a prominent role in the epic Mahābhārata. The epic Mahābhārata was narrated to Shaunaka by a storyteller named Ugrasrava Sauti during a conclave of sages headed by Shaunaka in a forest named Naimisha. Shaunaka also consoled Yudhishthira on the nature of suffering after the latter was exiled.

== See also ==
- Bhargava
- Bhrigu
