= Purva Mimamsa Sutras =

Ancient Hindu Philosophical text

The Mimamsa Sutra (Sanskrit: मीमांसा सूत्र, Mīmāṁsā Sūtra) or the Purva Mimamsa Sutras (ca. 300–200 BCE), written by Rishi Jaimini is one of the most important ancient Hindu philosophical texts. It forms the basis of Mimamsa, the earliest of the six orthodox schools (darshanas) of Indian philosophy. According to tradition, sage Jaimini was one of the disciples of sage Veda Vyasa, the author of the Mahabharata.

== Overview ==
The work is divided into twelve adhyayas (chapters), which are further divided into sixty padas (sections).

The text provides rules for the interpretation of the Vedas and also provides philosophical justifications for the observance of Vedic rituals, by offering meaning and significance of Vedic rituals to attain Moksha.

== Commentaries ==
Over the centuries many commentaries have been written on this text, with the most important being the Śabara Bhāṣya written by Śābara, which is the only extant commentary on all 12 chapters of the Mimamsa Sutras of Jaimini. The major commentaries written on the text, including the Śabara Bhāṣya, were by Kumarila Bhatta and Prabhakara Mishra. The Dvaita philosopher Raghavendra Tirtha also wrote a full commentary on the Mimamsa Sutras titled 'Bhatta Sangraha'. Ramanuja, Bhāskara (Bhedabheda Vedanta), Madhvacharya and Vallabha considered Pūrvamīmāṃsā and Uttaramīmāṃsā (Vedanta) as ekaśastra i.e. one undivided teaching:

1. Ramanujacharya says about this Sutra in the Sri Bhashya, his commentary on the Brahma Sutras - he (the Vrittikâra) will declare later on 'this Sârîraka-doctrine is connected with Jaimini's doctrine as contained in sixteen adhyâyas; this proves the two to constitute one body of doctrine.' Vedanta Desika, a scholar in line of ramanuja, composed works 'mImAmsA pAdukA' and 'sEshwara mImAmsA' to show unity between pUrvamImAmsA and uttaramImAmsA.
2. Vallabhacharya in his work "Patravalambanam", established the principle of Brahmavad and discarded the view that the meaning of the first part of Veda (Karma Kand or Purva Mimamsa) and the second part of Veda (Vedanta, Upanishad or Uttar Mimamsa) is different.
3. Bhāskara says about this Sutra in the Bhāskara-bhāṣya, i. i. i - In holding the view that the Brahma-sūtra is in a sense continuous with the Mīmāṃsā-sūtra, which the former must follow— for it is after the performance of the ritualistic duties that the knowledge of Brahman can arise, and the latter therefore cannot in any stage dispense with the need for the former—and that the Brahma-sūtras are not intended for any superior and different class of persons.

== Philosophy ==
Jaimini, in his Mimamsa Sutra, presents material activity and its results as the whole of reality (vipanam rtam). He, along with later proponents of Karma-mimamsa, philosophy teaches that material existence is endless and that there is no liberation. For Mimamsas, the cycle of karma is perpetual, and the best one can aim for is higher birth among the Devas. Therefore, they assert that the primary purpose of the Vedas is to engage human beings in rituals for creating good karma, and consequently the mature soul's prime responsibility is to ascertain the exact meaning of the Vedas' sacrificial injunctions and to execute them.

Codana-laksano 'rtho dharmah: "Duty is that which is indicated by the injunctions of the Vedas."(Mimamsa Sutra 1.1.2)

== Content ==
The first verse of the Mimamsa Sutras states that the text's purpose is an inquiry into dharma. The text establishes that dharma cannot be known through perception. Teachings of dharma without basis in the Vedas, such as of the Buddha and Jina, are based on perception. Therefore, they are not valid teachings of dharma, Jaimini reasons.

Mimamsa Sutra consists of twelve chapters:

- In the first chapter, the significance of collections of words with various meanings is discussed. This includes injunction (vidhi), explanatory passage (arthavada), hymn (mantra), tradition (smriti) etc.
- In the second chapter, discussions relating to the difference of various rites, refutation of erroneously proofs etc. are held.
- In the third chapter, sruti, sense of the passage (linga), context (vakya), and their respective weight when in apparent opposition to one another, the ceremonies called pratipatti-karmdni, things mentioned incidentally (anarabhyadhita) and the duties of the sacrifices are expounded.
- In the fourth chapter, the influence on other rites of the principal and subordinate rites, the fruit caused by the juhu and dice-playing, which forms a subordinate part of the rajasuya sacrifice are explained.
- Fifth chapter discusses relative order of various passages of sruti, different parts of sacrifice etc.
- In the sixth chapter, the persons qualified to offer sacrifices, their obligations, the substitutes for materials used in sacrifices, expiatory rites and the different sacrificial fires are made clear.
- In the seventh and eight chapters, transference of ceremonies and transference by virtue from one sacrifice to another are discussed.
- In the ninth chapter, adaptation of hymns when quoted in a new context (uha), and melodies(samans) and mantras are discussed.
- In the tenth, the discussion revolves around the non-performance of the primary rites and dependent rites, offerings to grahas etc.
- In the eleventh chapter, there is discussion on tantra (combining several acts one), and avapa (performance of an act more than once).
- In the twelfth chapter, prasanga, tantra and cumulation of concurrent rites (samuchchaya) is explained.
