= Vyasa Peetha =

Ashram of the Veda Vyasa Krishna Dwaipayan

- व्यास पीठ
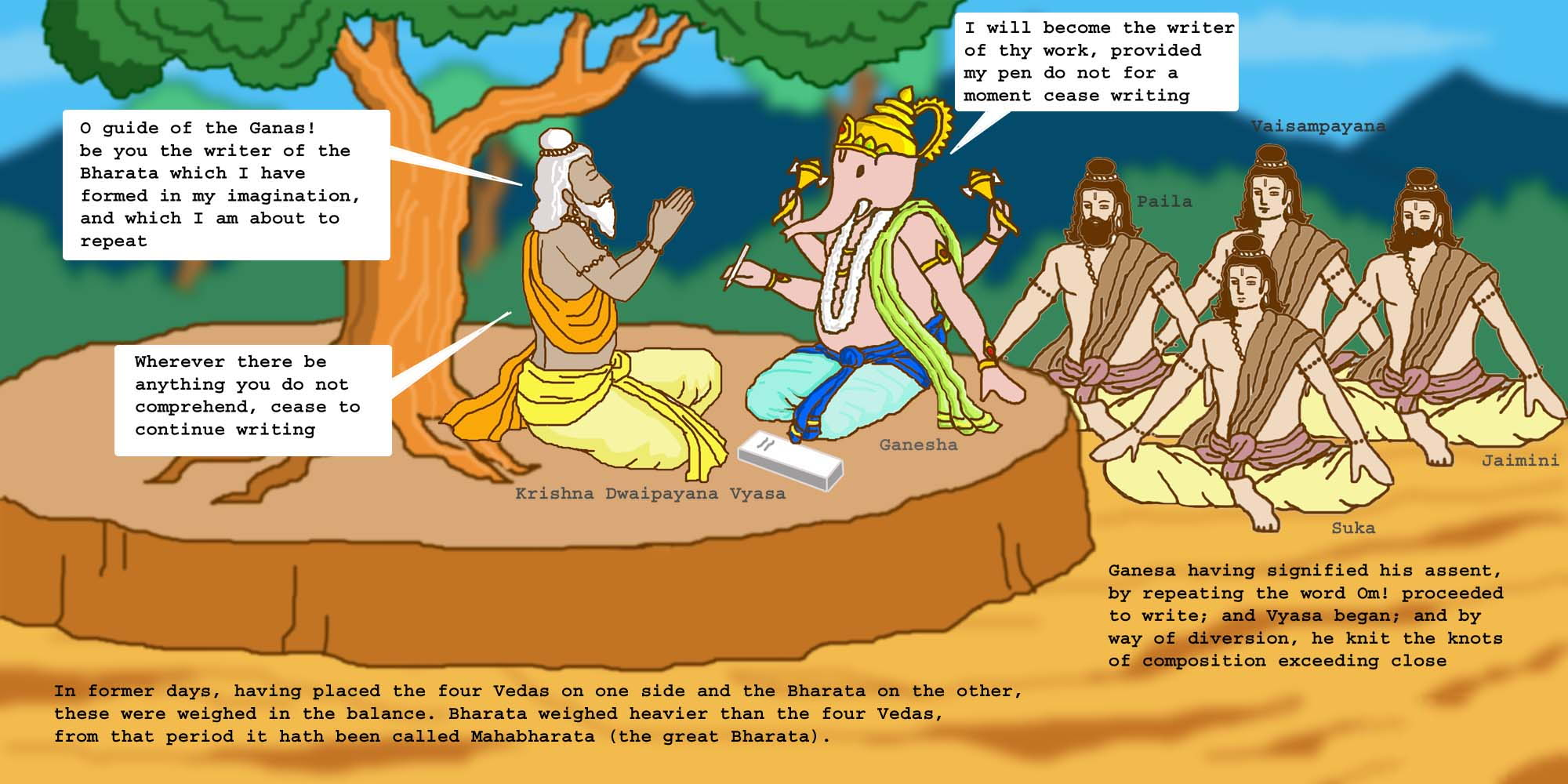
- Symbolic representation of Vyasa Peetha.

Monastery information
- Full name: Veda Vyasa Peetha
- Other name: Veda Vyasa Ashram
- Celebration: Guru Purnima

People
- Founder: Veda Vyasa Krishna Dwaipayan

Site
- Location: Naimisharanya Teerth, Sitapur district, Uttar Pradesh
- Country: India
- Visible remains: Banyan Tree
- Other information: Vedas, Puranas, Mahabharata, were composed here.

Vyasa Peetha ( Sanskrit: व्यास पीठ ), 'the seat of Vyasa', is the site at Naimisharanya Teerth in Sitapur district of Uttar Pradesh, India, where the Vedic sage Vyasa is said to have composed the Mahabaratha. An ashram called Vyas Gaddi is located at the site.

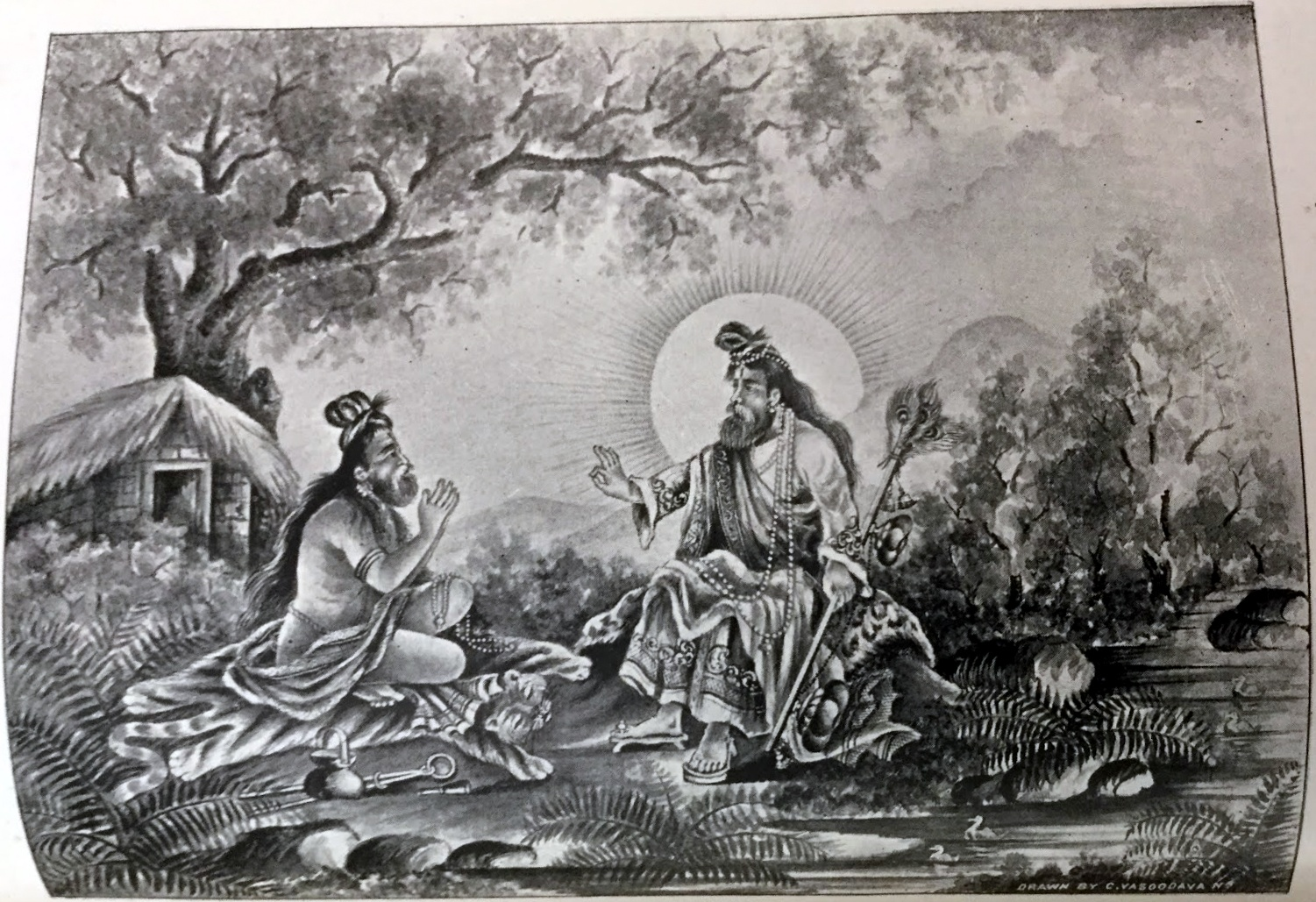
Tamil depiction of a meeting of Devarshi Narada with the Maharshi Veda Vyasa.

== Etymology ==
Vyasa is traditionally regarded as the compiler of Vedas and the composer of the Mahabaratha. Peetha means seat, altar or holy place where a deity resides ('sits'); it also refers to a temple or ashram where knowledge is acquired. Vyasa Gaddi refers to the ‘seat of Vyasa’.

The term Vyasa Peetha is also used to denote the seat where priests sits to recite the Veda's and other texts. Apart from the original Vyasa Peetha, later the during the period of Adi Shankaracharya, four Mathas at the four corners of the Indian subcontinent were established by him to facilitate the knowledge of Vedas and Puranas. These four Mathas are the Govardhana Math of Puri in east, the Jyotirmath in North, the Dwarka Sharada Peetha in west and the Sringeri Sharada Math in the south. These four Mathas in the four corners established by Adi Shankaracharya adorn the divine seats of the Vyasa Peetha. Presently, the pilgrimage of these four Mathas is known as Chaar Dham Yatra in Hinduism.

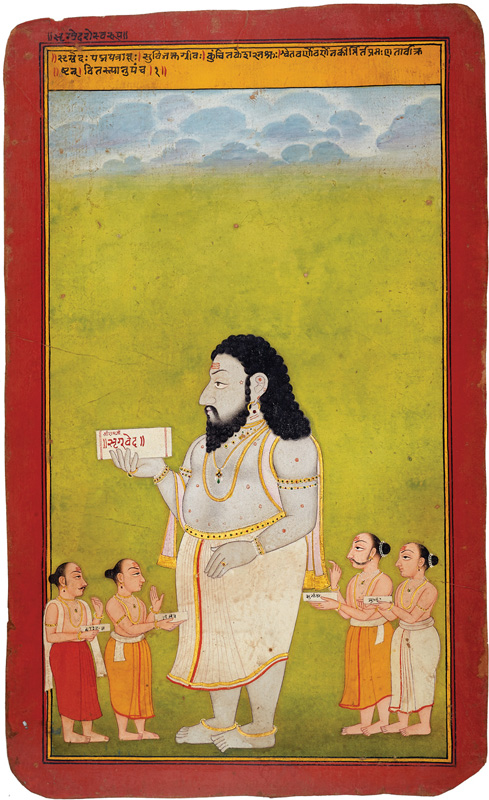
Depiction of Veda Vyasa entrusting the four Vedas to his four disciples Paila, Jaimini,Vaisampayana and Sumantu. Image is of 18th century by a Mewar court-artist, that portrait Rigaveda.

== Description ==
The Vyasa Peetha refers to the enlightened seat of Veda Vyasa. It is a highly important place in the tradition of the Vedic culture in the Indian subcontinent. The Vyasa Peetha is located at Naimisharanya Teerth in Sitapur district of Uttar Pradesh state in India. It is an important sacred place in Hindu pilgrimage, and an ashram called Veda Vyasa Ashram and Vyas Gaddi is located at the site. There is a small shrine dedicated to Vyasa, and there are triangular piles of clothes representing the presiding deity in the temple.

Near the vicinity of the Vyasa Peetha, there is legendary temple known as Lalita Devi Mandir. Similarly, according to the legends of the Puranas, there was a havan kund in the premises of the Vyasa Peetha, where 88 thousands rishis performed a great Yajna.
