= Ugrashravas =

Character in Hinduism

Ugrashravas Sauti (Sanskrit: उग्रश्रवस् सौति, also Ugraśravas, Sauti, Sūta, Śri Sūta, Suta Gosvāmī) is a character in Hindu literature, featured as the narrator of the Mahābhārata and several Puranas including the Shiva Purana, Bhagavata Purana, Harivamsa, Brahmavaivarta Purana, and Padma Purana, with the narrations typically taking place before the sages gathered in Naimisha Forest. He is the son of Lomaharshana (or Romaharshana), and a disciple of Vyasa, the author of the Mahābhārata. Ugrashravas is a bard of Puranic literature. The place where he narrated the Puranas to the sages is called as Suta Gaddi.

The entire Mahābhārata epic is structured as a dialogue between Ugrasravas Sauti (the narrator) and sage Saunaka (the narratee). The narration (Bharata) of the history of Bharata kings by sage Vaisampayana to Kuru king Janamejaya is embedded within this narration of Ugrasravas Sauti. Vaisampayana's narration (Jaya) in turn contains the narration of Kurukshetra War by Sanjaya, to Kuru king Dhritarashtra. Thus Mahābhārata has as a Story within a story structure.

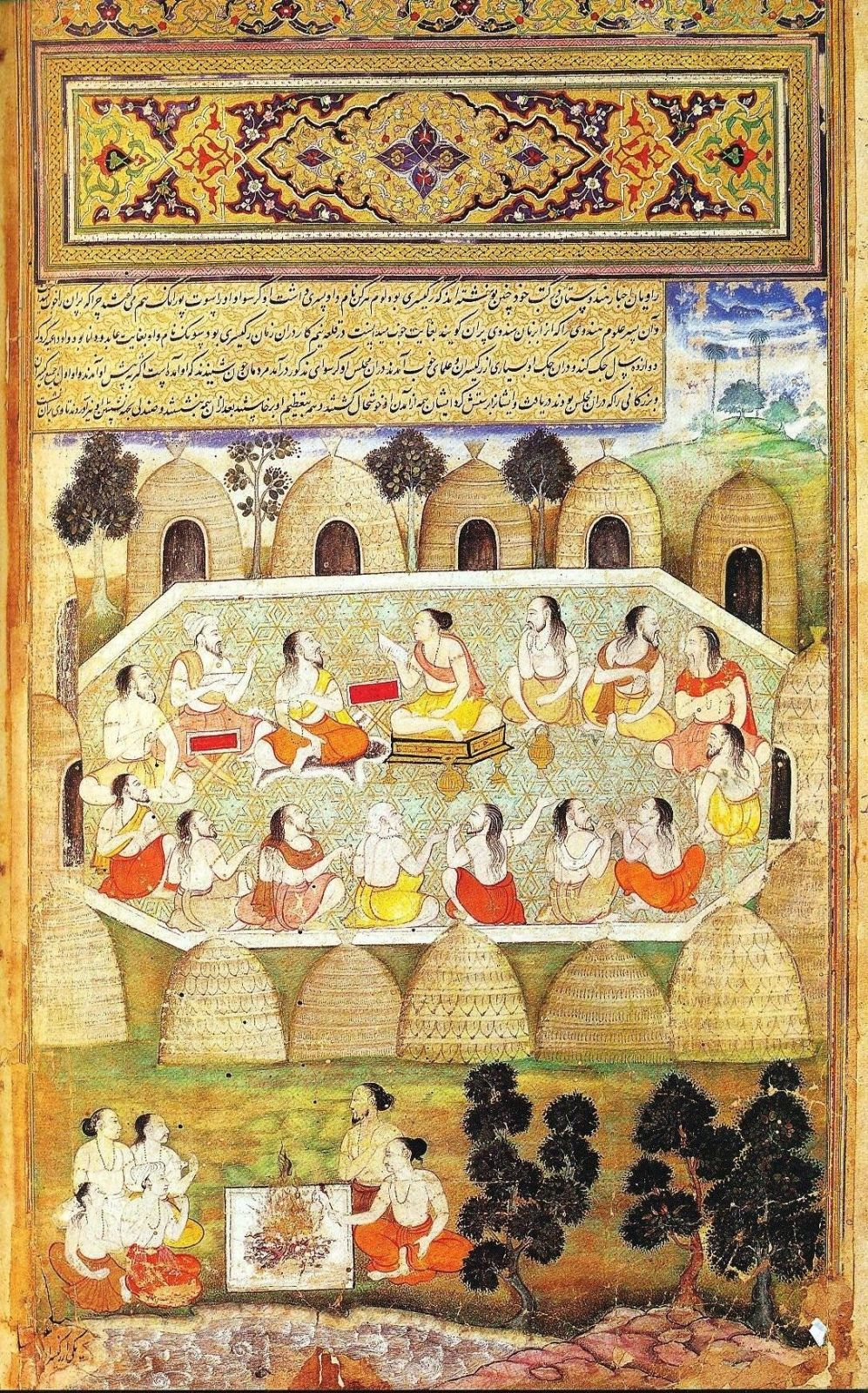
Sauti recites the slokas of the Mahabharata

Kisari Mohan Ganguli's English translation of the Mahābhārata begins by introducing Ugrasravas thus:

"Ugrasrava, the son of Lomaharshana, surnamed Sauti, well-versed in the Puranas, bending with humility, one day approached the great sages of rigid vows, sitting at their ease, who had attended the twelve year sacrifice of Saunaka, surnamed Kulapati, in the forest of Naimisha." (Mahabharata 1:1-2)

== Conflict with Balarama ==
The Bhagavata Purana gives an account of the conflict of Sauti's father Romaharṣaṇa with Balarama. During the Kurukshetra war, Balarama is performing a pilgrimage by visiting various sacred spots. As such, he came to the Naimisha Forest, where he saw Romaharṣaṇa narrating the Puranas to the sages present there. Everyone welcomed Balarama with joined palms, except Romaharṣaṇa. The angered Balarama killed Romaharṣaṇa, with a piece of kusa grass. Balarama offered to revive Romaharshana, but the sages asked, "Please see to it, O Rāma, that Your power and that of Your kuśa weapon, as well as our promise (of long life, etc. to Romaharṣaṇa) and Romaharṣaṇa’s death, all remain intact." Balarama fulfilled this by letting Romaharṣaṇa's son become the speaker of the Purāṇas, and let him be endowed with long life, strong senses, and stamina.
