= Śabara =

Śabara (also Śabara-svāmin) is a commentator on Jaimini's Purva Mimamsa Sutras, the Śābara-bhāṣyam, in turn commented upon by Kumarila Bhatta.

He dates to the early centuries CE, later than Patanjali's Mahabhashya, and earlier than Vatsyayana.

In his commentary on the Mimamsa Sutra, Śabara writes that perception, inference, supposition, or comparison cannot be a means of knowing dharma. He writes that the rest of the means of knowing depend on perception. Since perception cannot be used to understand dharma, neither can the other means of knowing. Based on this reasoning, Śabara posits that testimony, specifically the Veda, are the only way to know dharma.
