= Paila (Rishi) =

The promulgator of Rigaveda

Acharya Paila
- पैल
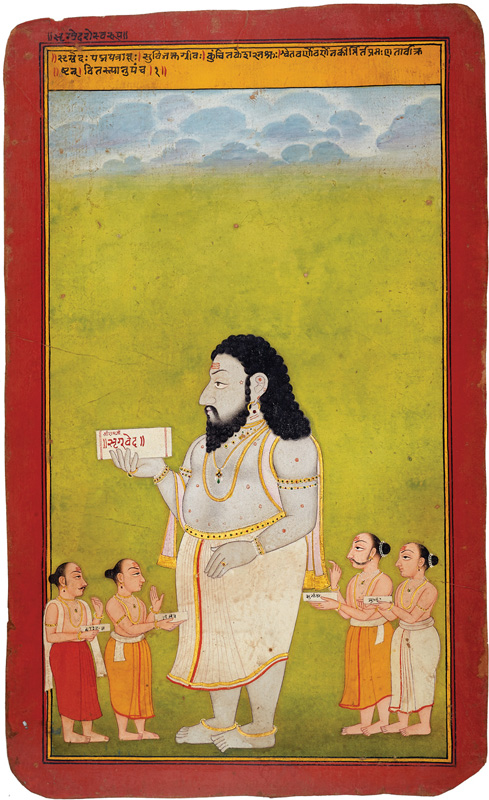
- 18th century CE Portrait of the four disciples of Veda Vyasa. Among the four disciples, one is Paila.
- Succeeded by: Bashkala
- Succeeded by: Indrapramiti

Personal life
- Parent: Pilâ (father)
- Era: Contemporary to Ashvala
- Education: Vyasa Peetha
- Known for: As the promulgator of Rigaveda
- Honours: Paramarshi

Religious life
- Religion: Hinduism
- School: Rigaveda
- Teachers: Parashara

Religious career
- Predecessor: Veda Vyasa

Paila (Sanskrit: पैल) was a prominent Vedic Rishi in the ancient Indian subcontinent. He was one of the four major disciples of the revered Vedic sage Veda Vyasa. He mastered the hymns or mantras of the Rigaveda. He was selected as the preserver and promotor of the Rigaveda branch of the Vedas by Veda Vyasa. He is known as the promulgator of the holy text Rigaveda in Hinduism. He was the son of the sage Pilâ.

== Early life ==
According to the Vedic texts, Paila was born at a family of rishi community. His father name was Pilâ. The name of Paila was derived from his father's name Pilâ. According to the 35th Shloka in the 33rd chapter of the Sabhā Parva in the text Mahabharata, the father name of Paila is Vasu. Later, Paila lived in the guidance of his teacher Parashara. Paila's contemporary colleague was Ashvala. The Vedic sage Parashara was the father of Veda Vyasa. After the death of the sage Parashara, Paila was looked after Veda Vyasa.

Later, Veda Vyasa became the Acharya of Paila. Even though Paila was taught by Veda Vyasa, he was older in age by eight years with Veda Vyasa.

== Description ==
Veda Vyasa taught Vahvricha Rik-Samhita to his disciple Paila. The Vahvricha Rik-Samhita refers to the Samhita part of the text Rigaveda. The sage Paila arrange the text and became the first Acharya of Rigaveda. Later, he divided it into two parts to his disciples Bashkala and Indrapramiti. In the texts of Puranas, Paila is honoured as an eminent revered Rishi with the title Paramarshi.
