= Vaisampayana =

Sage in Hinduism

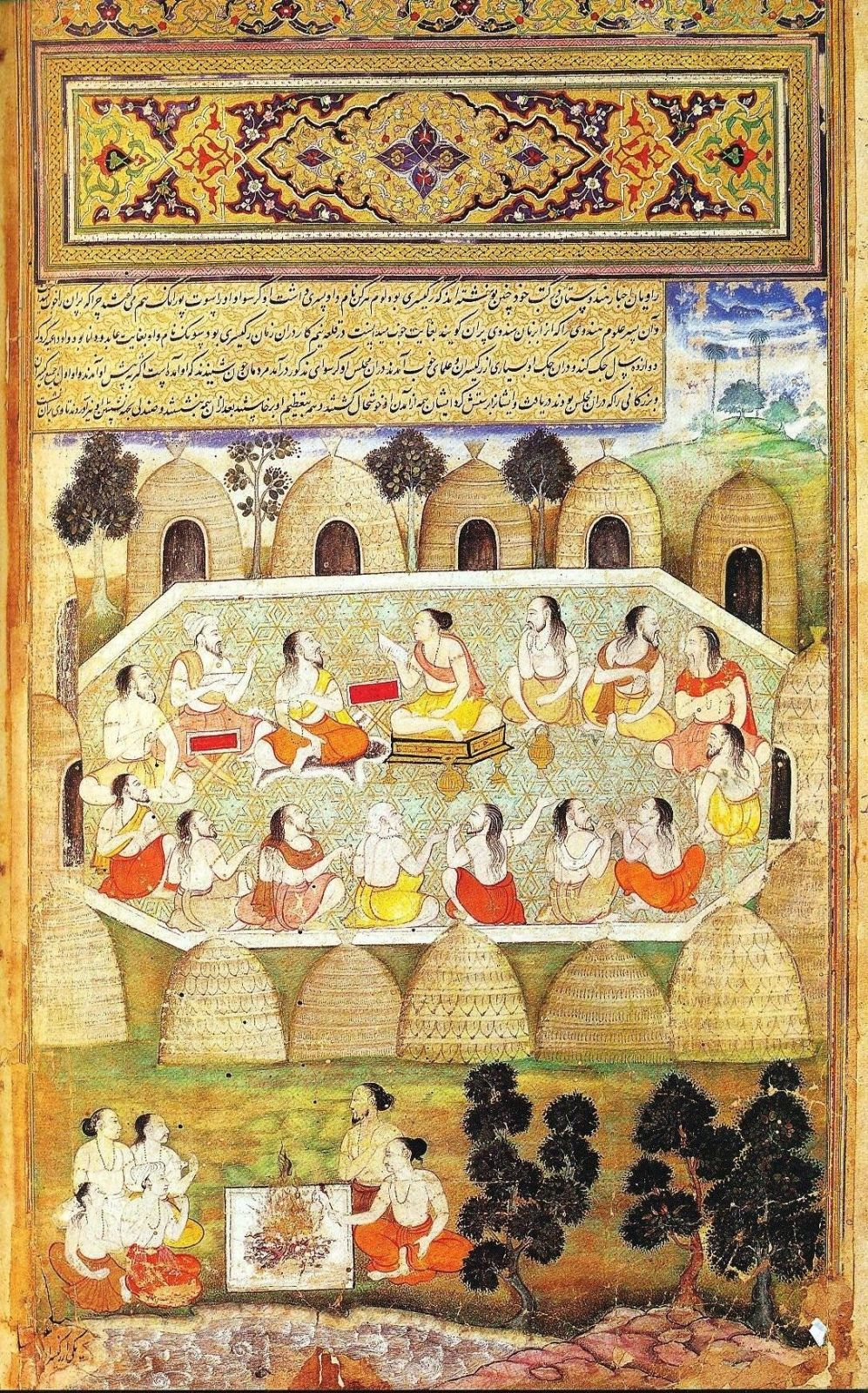
- Vaishampayana listens as Shaunaka recites the Mahabharata.
- Affiliation: Rishi
- Texts: Mahabharata, Harivamsa

Vaishampayana (Sanskrit: वैशंपायन, IAST: Vaiśaṃpāyana) is the traditional narrator of the Mahabharata, one of the two major Sanskrit epics of India. He was one of Vyasa's four main disciples. His nephew and disciple Yajnavalkya was also a well-known sage.

== Legend ==
Vaishampayana is a renowned sage who is stated to be the original teacher of the Krishna Yajur-Veda:

The great man of intellect Vaiśampāyana, the disciple of Vyāsa, divided the tree of Yajurveda into seven branches.

— Agni Purana, Chapter 150

The Ashvalayana Grihya Sutra mentions him as Mahabharatacharya. He is also mentioned in the Taittiriya Aranyaka and the Ashtadhyayi of Pāṇini.

Vyasa is regarded to have taught the Mahabharata of 100,000 verses to Vaishampayana. He is regarded to have recited the epic to King Janamejaya at his sarpa satra (snake sacrifice). The Harivamsha Purana is also recited by him, where he narrates the legend of Prithu's emergence from Vena.
