= Shandilya =

Gotra of Brahmins and Rajputs

Shandilya (IAST: Śāṇḍilya) is a gotra which is named after the great sage Shandilya, specifying that individuals of the gotra have Shandilya as one of their patrilineal ancestors. Shandilya Rishi was the progenitor of the Śāṇḍilya gotra. The name derives from the Sanskrit words Śaṇ, and Dilam, thus meaning Full Moon, therefore implying Śāṇḍilya to be the priest of the Moon God. People belonging to this gotra are considered to be of lunar race.

== Description ==
Shandilya gotra has three pravaras, that is three most excellent Rishis, they are Sandilya, Asita and Deval. Due to having three pravaras in the gotra, it is also called as Treepravara gotra. The Veda of this gotra is Samveda. Sandilya gotra is the largest gotra in Maithil Brahmins of Nepal and Bihar. They are known as Chhandog Brahmins. Many families claiming direct patrilineal ancestry to this gotra can be found throughout India and Nepal. The Brahmins of this gotra follow Kauthuma Sakha of Samaveda and they are known as Kauthumashakhiya.

People of this gotra hail from Nepal and many Indian states such as West Bengal, Bihar, Kashmir, Uttar Pradesh and Odisha. Many Saraswat Brahmin families residing in Punjab, Haryana and Himachal Pradesh claim Shandilya as their paternal ancestor.

== Mool ==
In the region of Mithila, there are 44 mools (origins) of Shandilya gotra among the Maithil Brahmins. Each of these mools is associated with their own Viji Purusha. The Viji Purusha is the known earliest ancestor who lived at the village of the mool. The mools are Dirghosh, Sarisav, Mahuva, Parvapalli, Khandwala, Gangoli, Yamugam, Karian, Mohari, Sazual, Madar, Pandoli, Jajiwal, Dahibhat, Tilaya, Mahav, Simmuel, Singhashram, Sodarpur, Kadaria, Allari, Hoiyar, Talhanpur, Parsanda, Parisara, Uttampur, Veernam, Chhatimaan, Kodaria, Barewa, Brahmpur, Budhaur, Gangor, Bhataur, Ghoshiyam, Koiyar, Karhiwar, Gangual, Chatauni, Tapanpur, Nanauti, Bhigual, and Machhuaal, etc.

Other than Brahmins, some clans of Rajputs, like Banauts, Waldias, and Parmars, have Shandilya Gotra and have Shandilya as one of their patrilineal ancestors. Similarly, the gotra of Suryavanshi Kshatriya Bamtela, Kachhniya and Netwani, etc is Shandilya. This gotra is also found in Bhumihar community. The descendants of Shandilya are also found in the region of Manipur. Many Manipuris (Meitei) consider themselves to be of Shandilya gotra. There are only few Nepalis with Sandilya Gotra such as Kafle, Poudar and Prasai but their population is relatively high compared to people with other gotras in Nepal. The gotra of several people from Barai and Tamoli castes is Shandilya.

== Related temples and places ==
- Shri Piplaj Mata Mandir, Osian - Goddess Piplaj is the Kuldevi of the Shandilya gotra families living at Osian in the Jodhpur district of the Rajasthan state in India.
- Shandilya Dham Mandir, Teghra - It is a Hindu shrine dedicated to the progenitor Rishi Shandilya of the gotra. It is maintained by the community belonging to the Shandilya gotra there. It is located at Teghra near Barauni town of the Begusarai district in the Mithila region of Bihar in India.
- Shandilya Rishi Samadhi is near Pune at Chakreshwar Mahadev Mandir in Chakan town .
- Shandilya Rishi Mandir at Shalin village in the Kullu district of the Himachal Pradesh in India.

== See also ==
- Shandilya Samhita
- Shandilya Bhakti Sutra
- Shandilya Smriti
- Shandilya Ashram
- Biresh Shnadilya
- Vaibhavi Shandilya
