= Pancharatra =

Ancient Indian religious movement around Narayana-Vishnu (Vaishnavism)

Pancharatra (IAST: Pāñcarātra) was a theistic movement in Hinduism that originated in the late 3rd-century BCE around Narayana and the various avatars and forms of Vishnu. It later merged with the Bhagavata tradition and contributed to the development of Vaishnavism. The Pancharatra movement's Sanskrit treatises, the Pancharatra Samhitas (also called the Pancharatra Agamas) number more than 200 texts and are influential across various Vaishnava movements, including the Madhva Sampradaya or Brahma Sampradaya of Madhvacharya and the Sri Vaishnava Sampradaya of Ramanuja.

The term Pancharatra literally means five nights (pañca: five, rātra: nights) in Sanskrit, though the name has multiple traditional and scholarly interpretations. The term first occurs in the Shatapatha Brahmana (Book 13), where the highest Purusha (Narayana) resolves to become all things and pervade all beings through the primordial Purushamedha yajna, known as the Pancharatra.

The Shandilya Sutras (~100 CE) are the earliest known texts that systematized the devotional Bhakti pancharatra doctrine. 2nd-century CE inscriptions in South India suggest that Pancharatra doctrines were known there by then. The 8th-century Adi Shankara criticized elements of the Pancharatra doctrine along with other theistic approaches, stating that the doctrine was against monistic spiritual pursuits and non-Vedic. The 11th-century Ramanuja developed a qualified monism doctrine (Vishishtadvaita) which bridged ideas of the Pancharatra movement and those of monistic ideas in the Vedas. The Pancharatra theology is a source of the primary and secondary avatar-related doctrines in traditions of Hinduism.

== History ==
Pancharatra likely has roots in the 3rd century BCE, as a religious movement around the ideas of a sage Narayana, who much later became identified as an avatar of Vishnu.

The earliest use of the word Pancharatra is found in section 7.1.10 of the Taittiriya Samhita, a Vedic text. The section describes a person going through a Pancharatra ritual to become a master of rhetorics. The section 13.6 of the Śatapatha Brāhmaṇa mentions Nārāyaṇa as the primordial divinity who performs this offering.

In the Nārāyaṇīya Parva, a section of the Śānti Parva (Book 12) of the Mahābhārata, Bhīṣma instructs Yudhiṣṭhira on the origin of the Pāñcarātra tradition. He states that the Citraśikhaṇḍī (Marīci, Atri, Aṅgirā, Pulastya, Pulaha, Kratu, and Vasiṣṭha) performed austerities which pleased Hari-Nārāyaṇa-Puruṣottama-Bhagavān. Pleased, Nārāyaṇa ordered Sarasvatī to enter the ṛṣis mouths who then composed the Pāñcarātra śāstra. The ṛṣis then recite the śāstra in front of Nārāyaṇa, who states that this śāstra will become an authentic pramāṇa just as the four Vedas are considered authentic pramāṇas. A genealogy of the tradition is then stated starting from Svayambhū Manu to Śukra to Bṛhaspati to Uparicara Vasu after which the tradition becomes invisible. In the same prakaraṇa (section) of the text, Vaiśampāyana gives another genealogy to Janamejaya, stating this dharma originated again and again with each birth of Brahmā from Nārāyaṇa, and that when it is forgotten in society it again returns to Nārāyaṇa. In his seventh birth from Nārāyaṇa's navel, Brahmā learns this tradition from Nārāyaṇa, and then teaches it to Dakṣa, who teaches it to Sūrya, who teaches it to Vivasvān, who teaches it to Vaivasvata Manu, who teaches it to Ikṣvāku, who taught it amongst the people. Vaiśampāyana further states that this is the same religious tradition which is earlier described in the Bhagavad Gītā.

Though the five-day ritual is mentioned along with many other sacrifices in the Vedic text, the origins of Pancaratra devotees and their tradition is unclear. The movement merged with the ancient Bhagavata tradition also around Krishna-Vāsudeva, and contributed to the development of Vaishnavism.

The 1st-century works by Shandilya are the earliest known systematization of the Pancharatra doctrine. This doctrine was known and influential around then, as is attested by the 2nd-century CE inscriptions in South India. Evidence suggests that they co-existed with the Bhagavata tradition in ancient times.

Adi Shankara (8th century), while possibly himself from a Pancharata background, criticized elements of the Pancharatra doctrine along with other theistic approaches stating it was against monistic spiritual pursuits and non-Vedic. According to Jacqueline Suthren Hirst, Shankara supported the use of icons and temple worship if it focussed as a means to comprehend Brahman as the sole metaphysical reality. However, he opposed devotional theism as an end in itself and the goal of spiritual pursuits. The Pancharatra tradition has historically disagreed with claims of it being non-Vedic, states Jan Gonda, and Pancharatra texts explicitly state that, "Pancharatra is Vedic, it originates in the Sruti" and that the "Pancharatra precepts and practices should be observed by anyone who has allegiance to the Vedas".

Ramanuja (11th century), the influential Sri Vaishnavism scholar who was born into the Pancharatra tradition, disagreed with Shankara and developed a qualified monism doctrine which integrated ideas of Pancharatra movement and those of monistic ideas in the Vedas. Ramanuja stated that the Vishnu of Pancharatra is identical to Vedanta's Brahman, where Purusha reflects the eternal soul that is Vishnu, and Prakriti the impermanent ever changing body of Vishnu.

Ānanda Tīrtha, also known as Madhvacharya (13th century), the founder of the Madhva line, has written in his commentary on the Mundaka Upanishad: "In Dvapara Yuga, Vishnu is exclusively worshiped according to the principles of the Pancharatra Scripture, but in this age of Kali Yuga, the Supreme Lord Hari is worshiped only by the chanting of his Holy Name."

Jiva Gosvami (16th century) had stated in his Paramātma Sandarbha, forming part of six principal Sandarbhas, or philosophical treatises of Gaudiya Vaishnavism, that, "Seeing that the imperfect scriptures in the modes of passion and ignorance bring only a host of troubles, and also seeing that the original Vedas are very difficult to follow properly, and thus being very dissatisfied with both of these, the all-knowing scripture authors affirm the superiority of the Pancharatras, which describe the pure absolute truth, Narayana, and the worship of the Lord, which is very easy to perform."

Vishnu worshipers of today, represented in a wide spectrum of traditions, generally follow the system of Pancharatra worship. The concept of Naḍa and Naḍa-Brahman appear already in the Sāttvata Samhita or Sāttvata Tantra and in the Jayākhya Samhita, two texts considered most canonical of Pancharatra texts.

=== The word 'Pancaratra' ===
Marion Rastelli notes that the meaning of 'Pancaratra' is not certain, with both scholars and proponents from the tradition offering interpretations. Though pañca is understood as "five", the interpretation of "rātra" differs. Most literally, rātra can mean "night" or denote the span of a day and a night, thus suggesting that the Pancharatra was taught for five days and nights. This meaning is indicated by a few Saṃhitās, such as the Mārkaṇḍeyasaṃhitā. Others, such as the Īśvarasaṃhitā, also indicate that it was taught to five different individuals.

According to J. A. B. van Buitenen, the word "Pancharatra" is explained in Naradiya Samhita as referring to a tradition of "five knowledges". Similarly, Jan Gonda states that the term "nights" in "five nights" in the Pancharatra tradition may be a metaphor for inner darkness, and "came to mean – how, we do not know", though indeed there have been many interpretations such as "five systems", "five studies" and "five rituals".

== Divine Manifestation ==
The nature of Atman (soul)

In the Pancharatra system, the soul is one with the Supreme,
but is also an individual.
Even in a state of salvation it retains the individuality,
to realize the bliss of union with the Supreme.

— Nanditha Krishna

The Pancharatra theology developed over time. It presents a theory on how creation manifested from a supreme Godhead via Purusha-Prakriti as the masculine-feminine manifestations of the divine. It states that the creation emerged through vyuhas (arrangements). According to Pancharatra doctrine, in the beginning, there was only Narayana as the highest changeless supreme God-head who transformed into four earthly emanations (chaturvyuha), the first of which was Vāsudeva-Krishna (Vāsudeva literally means "indwelling deity"). Further arrangements or emanations followed, secondly into Saṅkarṣaṇa (Balarama) as the lord over all life, thirdly into Pradyumna creating mind, and lastly into Aniruddha as ego (ahamkara). Thereafter, Brahma emerged from Aniruddha who created the empirical universe. Thus, the divinity was and is everywhere in Pancaratra, but in different aspects, one form or phase emerging from the previous.

In the 11th century CE, Ramanuja, a founder of Sri Vaishnava traditions, formalized the Pancharatra system for his followers. His philosophy of worship of Narayana was based on the pancaratric teachings.

Ramanuja taught that the deity absolute, Parabrahman, manifests in five possible aspects: Para, Vyuha, Vibhava, Antaryamin, and Archa. Living beings can interact with the divine through one or another of these five:

- Para: the invisible, eternal supreme;
- Vyuha: the invisible, impermanent supreme in form;
- Vibhavas: also called the Avataras, these are the incarnations of the supreme in various yugas (eras in Hindu cosmology) such as the Dashavatara;
- Antaryamin: not directly perceptible but can be inferred, the aspect of supreme whose presence can be felt by the devotee;
- Archa: visible icon form, filled with symbolism, consecrated in temples or revered images inside home (Shalagrama, conch shell, festive decorations), a means to remember and meditate on the supreme.

=== Influence ===
The Vyuha-related Pancharatra theology is a source of the primary and secondary avatar-related doctrines in traditions of Hinduism, particularly Sri Vaishnavism. According to Barbara Holdrege, a professor and comparative historian of religions, the Pancharatra doctrines influenced both Sri Vaishnavism and Gaudiya Vaishnavism, albeit with some differences. In Sri Vaishnavism, Vishnu-Narayana is supreme, while Vāsudeva, Samkarsana, Pradyumna and Aniruddha are the four Vyuhas. In Gaudiya Vaishnavism, the Vyuha theory is more complex, Krishna (Vāsudeva) is "Svayam Bhagavan" (the ultimate or Para Brahman) who manifests as Vyuhas, and he along with Samkarsana, Pradyumna and Aniruddha are the Vyuhas and the Purusha-avataras of the material realm.

The Pāñcarātra is considered authoritative by the Śrī Vaiṣṇava sampradāya (Viśiṣṭādvaita), Madhva sampradāya (Dvaita), Vallabha sampradāya (Śuddhādvaita), and Gauḍīya sampradāya (Acintyabhedābheda).

== Subtraditions ==
The Pancharatra tradition is divided into four subtraditions, or siddhānta: Āgamasiddhānta, Mantrasiddhānta, Tantrasiddhānta, and Tantrāntarasiddhānta. Detailed descriptions are found mainly for the Āgamasiddhānta and Mantrasiddhānta.

== Practices ==
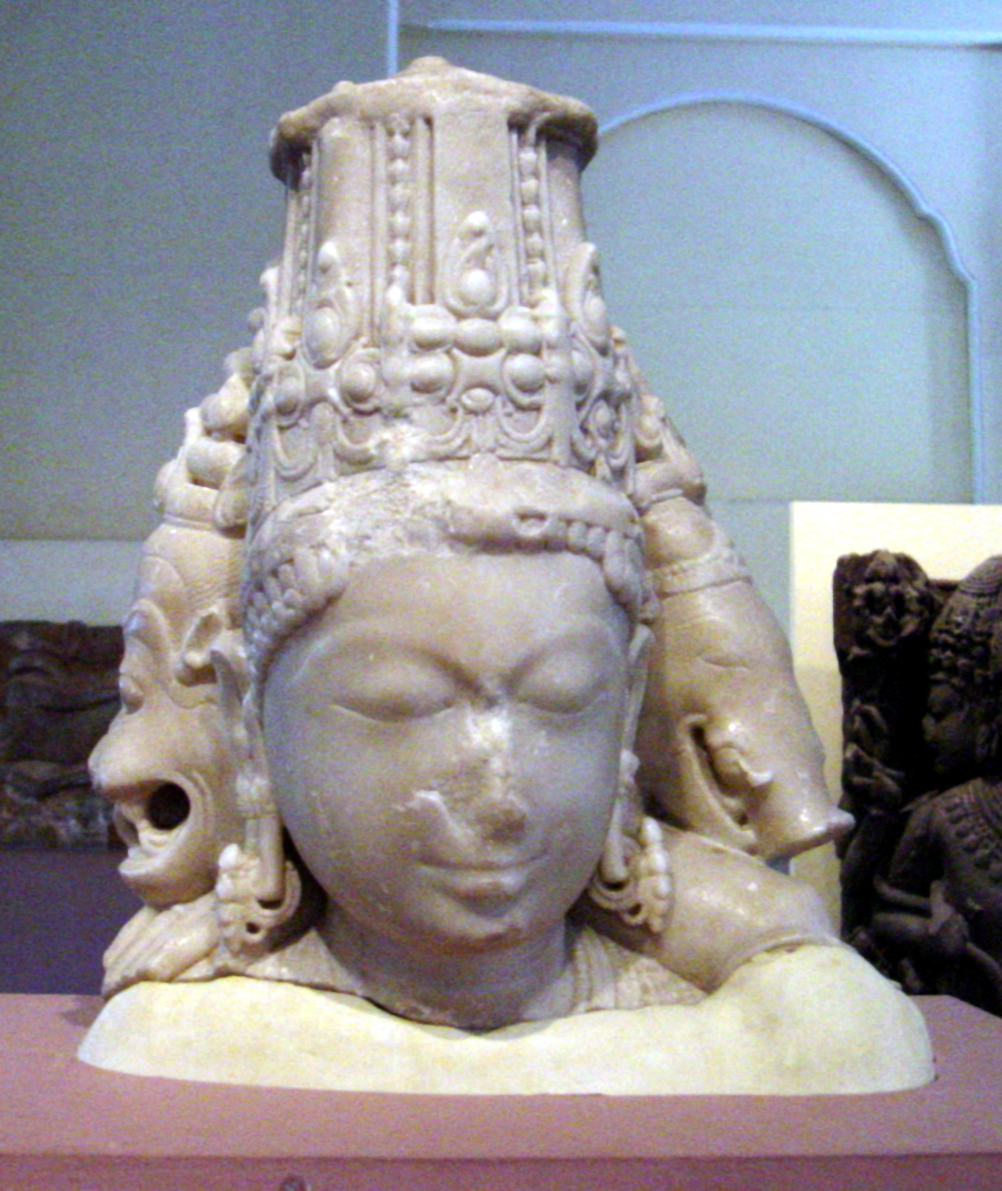
11th-century Vaikuntha Chaturmurti. It is one of the iconic representations of the Pancharatra Vyuhas theory found in some medieval Hindu temples.

The Pancharatra tradition taught the Panchakala or five observances practiced every day:

1. Abhigamana or ablutions and morning prayers to god.
2. Upadana or collecting worship materials.
3. Ijya or worship with offerings.
4. Svadhyaya or daily study.
5. Yoga and meditation.

The theology of divine manifestation in the Pancaratra tradition is significant, for it is believed that an understanding of the process by which Vishnu-Narayana emerged into empirical reality and human beings can lead one to reverse the process. Through practicing the reversal and moving from the empirical to ever more abstract, according to Pancaratra, human beings can access immanent Vāsudeva-Krishna and thereby achieve salvific liberation (moksha).

=== Temples ===
The Vaishnava temples and arts since the Gupta Empire, states Doris Srinivasan, attempted to present the Pancaratra ideas. In this system, states Srinivasan, "Vāsudeva, literally, "the indwelling deity," is the first emanation and the fountainhead of the successive emanations, which may be represented either anthropomorphically or theriomorphically in Hindu art". As one circumambulates the ancient and medieval Vaishnava cave temples, the devotee first walks past the icon representing Vāsudeva (most abstract) and then the successive Vyuhas (literally, "orderly arrangement").

== Pancharatra Texts ==
The Bhaktisūtras of Shandilya were one of the earliest systematic treatises on the Pancaratra doctrine. The Pancaratra literature constitutes the Āgama texts of Vaishnavism. Like the Shaiva counterpart, it not only presents the theology, but describes the details, symbolism and procedures of Vaishnava temples building and rituals.

The samhitas are the tradition's authoritative texts 'in the strict sense'. According to the Pancharatra tradition, there are 108 samhitas, but its texts list over 200 samhitas. The samhitas are anonymous, and were often revised over time. They impart teachings through the form of a dialogue where the main speaker is Vishnu. They include teachings about ritual, theology, cosmology, and praxis.

Many Pancaratra texts have been lost. Some surviving Pancaratra texts, with their general focus, are:

- Satvata Samhita: treatise on divine manifestations (vyuhas), forty six incarnations of Vishnu, and worship methodology
- Ahirbudhnya Samhita: discusses philosophy, vyuha theory, alphabet and rituals
- Hayashirsha Samhita: rituals and deities
- Padma Samhita: Panchakala practices for the devotee, festivals and mantras
- Paushkara Samhita: iconography and worship, believed to be a gem along with the Satvata Samhita
- Maha Sanatkumara Samhita: a large text on religious practice
- Isvara Samhita: meditation, worship and rituals.
- Valmiki Samhita: Vishishtadvaita, important in the worship of Rama and Sita.

=== List of agamas ===
The Pancharatra texts are samhitas and tantras which both classify as Agama due to subject matter. The Agamas are predominantly divided into Saiva, Sakta and Vaishnava Agamas. The Vaishnava Agamas are the Pancharatra Agama and Vaikhanasa Agama and they conclude Brahman as Narayana or Vishnu. The Mahabharata subscribes to the Pancharatra philosophy in its Narayaniya section. According to the author Vishnulok Bihari Srivastava, "Pancharatra has been discussed in the Narayanopakhyana section of Mahabharata. It has been mentioned that Narada had imbibed the essence of this tantra from Sage Narayana. It has been accepted as part of Veda named Ekayana. As many as 215 Pancharatra Samhitas have been mentioned in Kapinjala Samhita".

A list of Saṃhitās based on the list of published and unpublished, complete and incomplete Saṃhitās from the catalogue prepared by Sadhu Parampurushdas and Sadhu Shrutiprakashdas is as follows:

- Agastya-saṃhitā
- Anantākhya-saṃhitā
- Aniruddha-saṃhitā
- Ahirbudhnya-saṃhitā
- Ānanda-saṃhitā
- Īśvara-saṃhitā
- Īśvara-saṃhitā (Nṛsiṃhakalpa)
- Upendra-saṃhitā
- Umā-saṃhitā
- Aupagāyana-saṃhitā
- Kaṇva-saṃhitā
- Kapiñjala-saṃhitā
- Kapila-saṃhitā
- Kāśyapa-saṃhitā
- Kāśyapottara-saṃhitā
- Khagapraśna-saṃhitā
- Khagendra-saṃhitā
- Khageśvara-saṃhitā
- Gajendra-saṃhitā
- Garga-saṃhitā
- Govinda-saṃhitā
- Gautama-saṃhitā
- Citraśikhaṇḍi-saṃhitā
- Jayākhya-saṃhitā
- Jayottara-saṃhitā
- Jñānāmṛtasāra-saṃhitā
- Jñānārṇava-saṃhitā
- Tantratilaka-saṃhitā
- Trayaśatottara-saṃhitā
- Dūrvāsā-saṃhitā
- Narasiṃhapādma-saṃhitā
- Nalakūbara-saṃhitā
- Nārada-saṃhitā
- Nāradīya-saṃhitā
- Nārasiṃha-saṃhitā
- Nārāyaṇa-saṃhitā
- Pañcapraśna-saṃhitā
- Padmanābha-saṃhitā
- Padmodbhava-saṃhitā
- Parama-saṃhitā
- Paramapuruṣa-saṃhitā
- Parāśara-saṃhitā
- Pādma-saṃhitā
- Pādma-saṃhitā-tantram
- Pārameśvara-saṃhitā
- Pārameṣṭhya-saṃhitā
- Pārāśarya-saṃhitā
- Purāṇa-saṃhitā
- Puruṣottama-saṃhitā
- Pūrṇa-saṃhitā
- Pauṣkara-saṃhitā
- Pradyumna-saṃhitā
- Prahlāda-saṃhitā
- Balapauṣkara-saṃhitā
- Bṛhadbrahma-saṃhitā
- Bṛhaspati-mahātantram
- Bodhāyana-tantram
- Brahma-tantram
- Brahma-saṃhitā
- Bhāgavata-saṃhitā
- Bhāradvāja-saṃhitā
- Bhārgava-saṃhitā
- Maṅkaṇa-saṃhitā
- Mahākāla-pañcarātram
- Mahālakṣmī-saṃhitā
- Mahāsanatkumāra-saṃhitā
- Māyāvaibhava-saṃhitā
- Mārkaṇḍeya-saṃhitā
- Māheśvara-tantram
- Lakṣmī-tantram
- Vālmīki-saṃhitā
- Varāha-saṃhitā
- Vāmana-saṃhitā
- Vāyu-saṃhitā
- Vāsiṣṭha-saṃhitā
- Vāsudeva-saṃhitā
- Viśva-saṃhitā
- Viśvāmitra-saṃhitā
- Viśveśvara-saṃhitā
- Viṣṇu-tantram
- Viṣṇu-saṃhitā
- Viṣṇutattva-saṃhitā
- Viṣṇutilaka-saṃhitā
- Viṣṇumandira-saṃhitā
- Viṣṇurahasya-saṃhitā
- Viṣṇusiddhānta-saṃhitā
- Viṣvaksena-saṃhitā
- Vihagendra-saṃhitā
- Vihageśvara-saṃhitā
- Vṛddhapādma-saṃhitā
- Vaihāyasī-saṃhitā
- Vyāsa-saṃhitā
- Śāṇḍilya-saṃhitā
- Śukapraśna-saṃhitā
- Śeṣa-saṃhitā
- Śaunaka-saṃhitā
- Śaunakīya-saṃhitā
- Śrī-śāstram
- Śrīkālaparā-saṃhitā
- Śrīdhara-saṃhitā
- Śrīpraśna-saṃhitā
- Saṅkarṣaṇa-saṃhitā
- Sanaka-saṃhitā
- Sanat-saṃhitā
- Sanatkumāra-saṃhitā
- Sananda-saṃhitā
- Sātyaki-tantram
- Sātvata-saṃhitā
- Sārasamuccaya-saṃhitā
- Sāṃvarta-saṃhitā
- Sudarśana-saṃhitā
- Suparṇapraśna-saṃhitā
- Hayagrīva-tantram
- Hayaśīrṣa-saṃhitā
- Haṃsapārameśvara-saṃhitā
- Hiraṇyagarbha-saṃhitā
- (Śrī)kālottara-saṃhitā
- (Śrīman)nārāyaṇa-saṃhitā

Many more Samhitas, of which only the name is known and are non-extant, are listed in the work as well.

In the Ranganathaswamy Temple of Srirangam, the Paramesvara Samhita, a variant of the Paushkara Samhita, is in adherence.

In the Varadaraja Perumal Temple of Kanchipuram, the Jayakhya Samhita is followed.

In the Cheluvanarayana Swamy Temple of Melukote, the Ishvara Samhita is followed.

In the Pundarikaksha Swamy Temple of Tiruvellarai, the Padma Samhita is followed.

In Tirukkudantai of Kumbakonam, Aravamudhan Sarangapani, a form of Vishnu, is worshipped with the Sriprasna Samhita.

Gaudiya Vaishnavas follow the Brahma Samhita and the Naradiya Samhita.

The Sreevallabha Temple of Kerala follows the Durvasa Samhita and the Ahirbudhnya Samhita.

Pāñcarātra system
	Vyūhas	Image	Attributes	Symbol	Direction	Face	Concept
Narayana; Vishnu	Vāsudeva		Chakra Wheel; Gadā Mace; Shankha Conch	Garuda Eagle	East	Saumya (Placid/ benevolent)	Jṅāna Knowledge
Narayana; Vishnu	Samkarsana		Lāṅgala Plough; Musala Pestle; Wine glass	Tala Fan palm	South	Simha Lion	Bala Strength
Narayana; Vishnu	Pradyumna		Cāpa Bow; Bāṇa Arrow	Makara Crocodile	West	Raudra Kapila	Aiśvaryā Sovereignty
Narayana; Vishnu	Aniruddha		Carma Shield; Khaḍga Sword	Ṛṣya (ऋष्य) White-footed antelope	North	Varaha Boar	Śakti Power

== Sources ==
- Hudson, Dennis (2002), Early Evidence of the Pancaratra Agama as Chapter 8 in The Roots of Tantra, SUNY Press
