= Brahmavana =

Village in Mithila region, Bihar, India

Brahmavana ब्रह्मवाना Brahmabana
- Village
- Brahmavana
- Interactive map of Brahmavana
- Coordinates: 25.7998103°N 85.7181628°E
- Country: India
- State: Bihar
- Region: Mithila
- District: Samastipur
- Block: Sarairanjan
- Panchayati Raj: Panchayat Samiti

Government
  - Type: Mukhiya
  - Body: Latbasepura Gram Panchyat
- Demonym: Maithil

Languages
  - Official language: Mother language: Hindi; Maithili

Brahmavana (Maithili: ब्रह्मवाना) is a village in the Mithila region of India. It is located in the Sarairanjan block of the Samastipur district in the Bihar state. It comes under the Latbasepura Gram Panchayat. The village is known for organising various cultural activities in region. The mother language of the village is Maithili.

== Description ==
According to legend, it is believed that in the ancient times there was an ashram of the Vedic sage Shandilya in the village. Apart from the Shandilya Ashram, there are several other Hindu shrines in the village. Birjeshwardham is a famous tirtha in the village. The Birjeshwardham is known for organising different types of grand Yajna in its campus from time to time. Annually a five-days Shatchandi Mahayajna is organised at the premises of the Birjeshwardham in the village. On the inaugural day of the Mahayajna, a grand Kalash Shobha Yatra is taken out in the village. In the Kalash Yatra, 151 to 251 girls (Kanya) from the village participate to bring sacred water. These girls are provided pots for bringing sacred water (Achhinjal) from the Birja Sarovar. After filling the pots with the sacred water of the Birja Sarovar, these are installed at the site of the Mahayagna. During the installation of the water filled pots at the Mahayajna site, Pandits chant Vedic Mantras. A large number of devotees flock during the functions of the Shatchandi Mahayajna in the village. The village is also called as Brahmabana.
