= Shandilya Vidya =

Doctrine of the sage Shandilya

Shandilya Vidya (Sanskrit: शाण्डिल्यविद्या, Romanised: Śāṇḍilya Vidyā), as detailed in the Chandogya Upanishad, is a doctrine attributed to the Vedic sage Brahmarshi Shandilya that emphasizes the importance of meditating on Brahman, the all-encompassing reality. It highlights the concept of Brahman as the source, sustenance, and dissolution of the universe, and suggests that one's state after death is determined by their will and desires cultivated during life. The vidya also explores the nature of the Self, describing it as both infinitesimally small and infinitely vast, encompassing everything within.

The famous quotes of Shandilya Vidya

"सर्वं खल्विदं ब्रह्म"

- English translation "All this is Brahman"

— Shandilya, Shandilya Vidya, Chandogya Upanishad

== Description ==
The Shandilya Vidya is the part of Chandogya Upanishad. It is mentioned in the Section 14 of the third chapter of the Upanishad. It is also repeated with some textual variations in the text Shatapatha Brahmana (x. 6. 3). It is also taught in the Agnirahasya and the Brihadaranyaka Upanishad.

According to Dr Radhakrishnan, Shandilya Vidya affirms the oneness of the individual soul (Atman) and the supreme Brahman. He mentioned in his commentary on the Vedanta philosophy that the Sandilya Vidya does not distinguish between the lower and the higher Brahman. It is the revelation of the Supreme Being and the essence of the entire Upanishad wisdom.

The concept of the Atman and the supreme Brahman and their unity was first realised by the sage Shandilya. His insight on the concept of the Atman and the supreme Brahman was called as Shandilya Vidya.

== Contents ==
In the text Chandogya Upanishad, the Shandilya Vidya contains four verses.

The first verse starts with the opening statement "All this is Brahman,". It is the fundamental declaration that the Brahman is the ultimate reality, the supreme cosmic spirit, the ground of all existence. In the verse it is further said that the Universe comes forth from the Brahman, merges and breathes in it. Therefore one should meditate the Brahman with a calm mind. Further it is said that a man in fact is made up of willpower. He becomes whatever he wishes in this world when he leaves here. Hence, keeping this knowledge in mind, he should build his willpower.

The second verse states about the inner self (Atman). According to the second verse, "He who is made up of mind, whose body is subtle, whose form is light, whose thoughts are true, whose nature is like the Akaasha (space), who created this universe, who follows all righteous desires, who bears all pleasant smells, who is endowed with all tastes, who never speaks and who is without greed, agitation and eagerness, He is my Self (Atman) within the inner self."

In the third verse, the dimension (size) of the Atman or the Brahman has been compared with the available examples of lager to largest and smaller to smallest objects in the universe. And finally it has been declared that the Atman and the supreme Brahman are beyond these all sizes.

In the fourth verse, Shandilya declared that the self (Atman) is the Brahman. When one goes from here, he will certainly go to the supreme Brahman; He who has such faith and in whom there is no doubt will surely attain the ultimate Brahman.

Similarly in the text Shatapatha Brahmana, Shandilya Vidya is the part of Agnirahasya. It is briefly described in the two verses of the third Brahmana of the sixth chapter in the tenth Khanda of the text Shatapatha Brahmana.
