= Sutra =

Text in Hinduism, Buddhism, or Jainism, often a collection of aphorisms

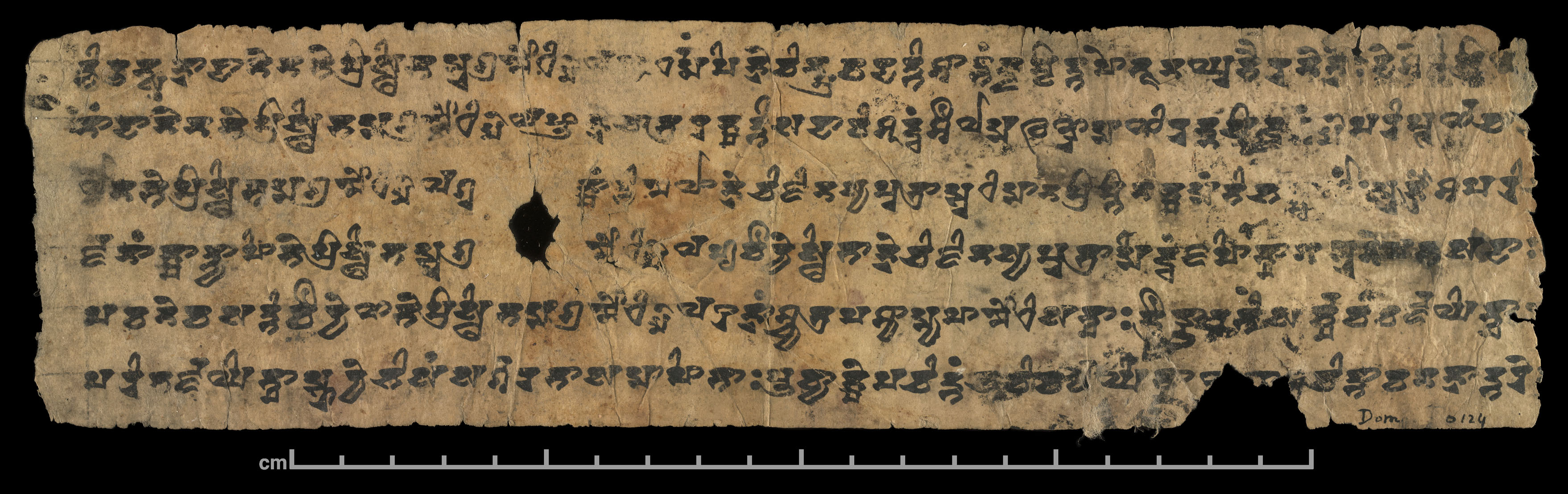
A Sanskrit manuscript page of Lotus Sutra (Buddhism) from South Turkestan in Brahmi script

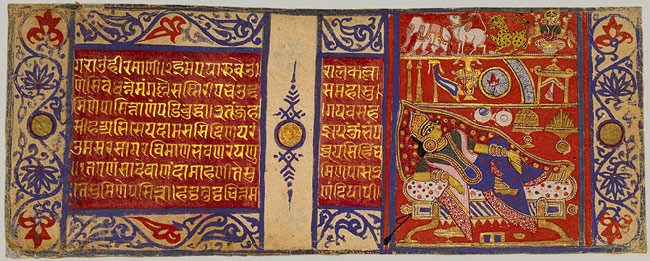
A manuscript page from Kalpa Sūtra (Jainism)

Sutra (Sanskrit: सूत्र, romanized: sūtra, lit. 'formula') in Indian literary traditions refers to an aphorism or a collection of aphorisms in the form of a manual or, more broadly, a condensed manual or text. Sutras are a genre of ancient and medieval Indian texts found in Hinduism, Buddhism, and Jainism.

In Hinduism, sutras are a distinct type of literary composition, a compilation of short aphoristic statements. Each sutra is any short rule, like a theorem distilled into few words or syllables, around which teachings of ritual, philosophy, grammar, or any field of knowledge can be woven. The oldest sutras of Hinduism are found in the Brahmana and Aranyaka layers of the Vedas. Every school of Hindu philosophy, Vedic guides for rites of passage, various fields of arts, law, and social ethics developed respective sutras, which help teach and transmit ideas from one generation to the next.

In Buddhism, sutras, also known as suttas, are canonical scriptures, many of which are regarded as records of the oral teachings of Gautama Buddha. They are not aphoristic, but are quite detailed, sometimes with repetition. This may reflect a derivation from Vedic or Sanskrit sūkta (well spoken), rather than from sūtra (thread).

In Jainism, sutras, also known as suyas, are canonical sermons of Mahavira contained in the Jain Agamas as well as some later (post-canonical) normative texts.

== Etymology ==
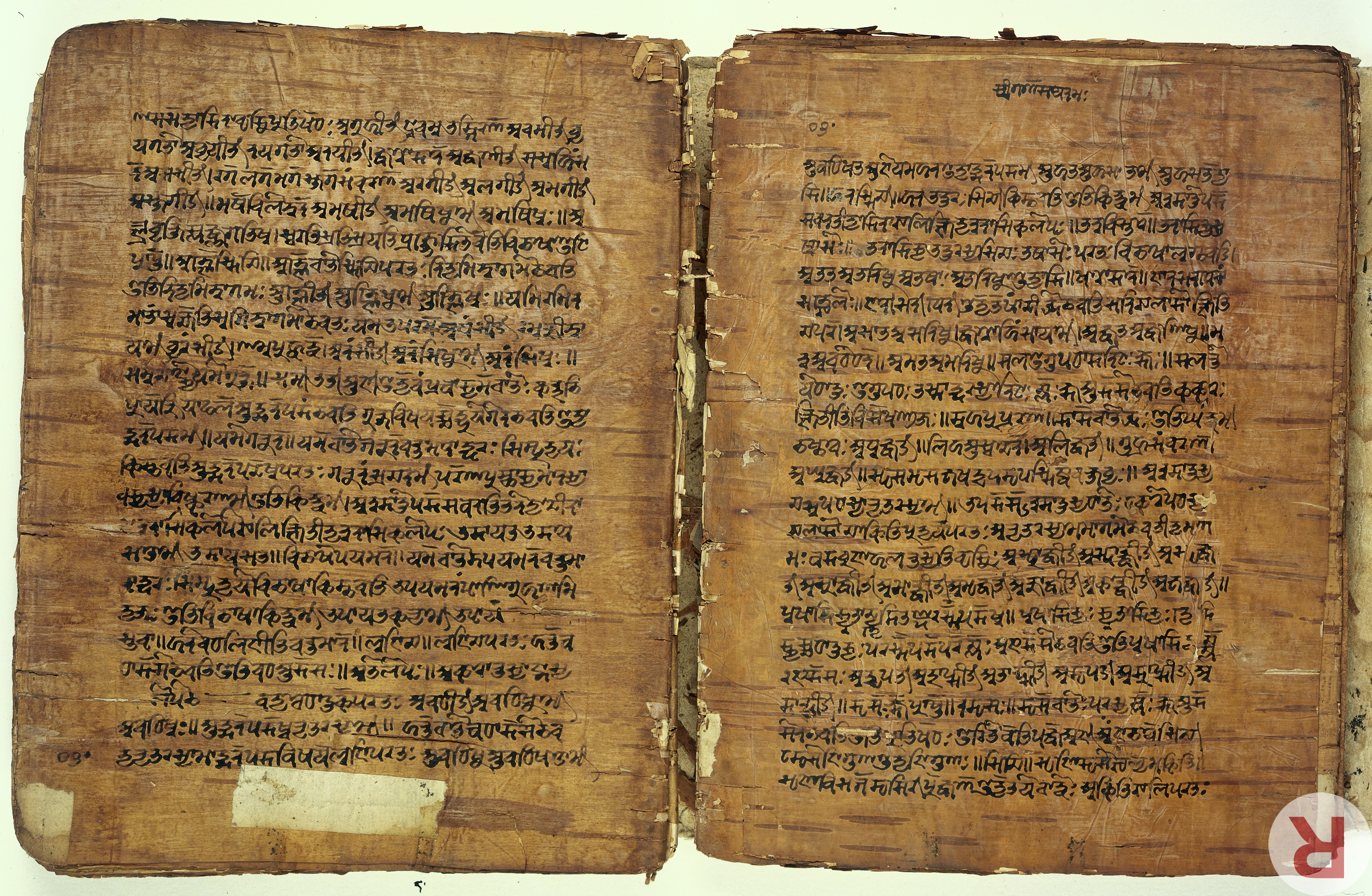
A 17th-century birch bark manuscript of ancient Panini Sutra, a treatise on grammar, found in Kashmir

The Sanskrit word Sūtra (Sanskrit: सूत्र, Pali: sutta, Ardha Magadhi: sūya) means "string, thread". The root of the word is siv, "that which sews and holds things together". The word is related to sūci (Sanskrit: सूचि) meaning "needle, list", and sūnā (Sanskrit: सूना) meaning "woven".

In the context of literature, sūtra means a distilled collection of syllables and words, any form or manual of "aphorism, rule, direction" hanging together like threads with which the teachings of ritual, philosophy, grammar, or any field of knowledge can be woven.

A sūtra is any short rule, states Moriz Winternitz, in Indian literature; it is "a theorem condensed in few words". A collection of sūtras becomes a text, and this is also called sūtra (often capitalized in Western literature).

A sūtra is different from other components such as Shlokas, Anuvyakhayas, and Vyakhyas found in ancient Indian literature. A sūtra is a condensed rule which succinctly states the message, while a Shloka is a verse that conveys the complete message and is structured to certain rules of musical meter, an Anuvyakhaya is an explanation of the reviewed text, while a Vyakhya is a comment by the reviewer.

== History ==
Sutra known from the Vedic era
Veda	Sutras
Rigveda	Asvalayana Sutra (§), Sankhayana Sutra (§), Saunaka Sutra (¶)
Samaveda	Latyayana Sutra (§), Drahyayana Sutra (§), Nidana Sutra (§), Pushpa Sutra (§), Anustotra Sutra (§)
Yajurveda	Manava-sutra (§), Bharadvaja-sutra (¶), Vadhuna-sutra (¶), Vaikhanasa-sutra (¶), Laugakshi-sutra (¶), Maitra-sutra (¶), Katha-sutra (¶), Varaha-sutra (¶), Apastamba-sutra (§), Baudhayana-sutra (§)
Atharvaveda	Kusika Sutra (§)
¶: only quotes survive; §: text survives

Sutras first appear in the Brahmana and Aranyaka layer of Vedic literature. They grow in number in the Vedangas, such as the Shrauta Sutras and Kalpa Sutras. These were designed so that they can be easily communicated from a teacher to student, memorized by the recipient for discussion, for self-study, or for reference.

A sutra by itself is condensed shorthand, and the threads of syllable are difficult to decipher or understand without associated scholarly Bhasya or deciphering commentary that fills in the "weft".

The oldest manuscripts that have survived into the modern era that contain extensive sutras are part of the Vedas, dated from the late 2nd millennium BCE through to the mid 1st millennium BCE. The Aitareya Aranyaka, for example, states Winternitz, is primarily a collection of sutras. Their use and ancient roots are attested by sutras being mentioned in larger genre of ancient non-Vedic Hindu literature called Gatha, Narashansi, Itihasa, and Akhyana (songs, legends, epics, and stories).

In the history of Indian literature, large compilations of sutras, in diverse fields of knowledge, have been traced to the period from 600 BCE to 200 BCE (mostly after Buddha and Mahavira), and this has been called the "sutras period". This period followed the more ancient Chhandas period, Mantra period and Brahmana period.

(The ancient) Indian pupils learnt these sutras of grammar, philosophy, or theology by the same mechanical method which fixes in our (modern era) minds the alphabet and the multiplication table.

— Max Müller, History of Ancient Sanskrit Literature

== Hinduism ==
Some of the earliest surviving specimens of sutras of Hinduism are found in the Anupada Sutras and Nidana Sutras. The former distills the epistemic debate whether Sruti or Smriti or neither must be considered the more reliable source of knowledge, while the latter distills the rules of musical meters for Samaveda chants and songs.

A larger collection of ancient sutra literature in Hinduism corresponds to the six Vedangas, or six limbs of the Vedas. These are six subjects that are said in the Vedas to be necessary for complete mastery of the Vedas. The six subjects with their own sutras were "pronunciation (Shiksha), meter (Chandas), grammar (Vyakarana), explanation of words (Nirukta), time keeping through astronomy (Jyotisha), and ceremonial rituals (Kalpa). The first two, states Max Muller, were considered in the Vedic era to be necessary for reading the Veda, the second two for understanding it, and the last two for deploying the Vedic knowledge at yajnas (fire rituals). The sutras corresponding to these are embedded inside the Brahmana and Aranyaka layers of the Vedas. Taittiriya Aranyaka, for example in Book 7, embeds sutras for accurate pronunciation after the terse phrases "On Letters", "On Accents", "On Quantity", "On Delivery", and "On Euphonic Laws".

The fourth and often the last layer of philosophical, speculative text in the Vedas, the Upanishads, too have embedded sutras such as those found in the Taittiriya Upanishad.

The compendium of ancient Vedic sutra literature that has survived, in full or fragments, includes the Kalpa Sutras, Shulba Sutras, Srauta Sutras, Dharma Sutras, Grhya Sutras, and Smarta traditions . Other fields for which ancient sutras are known include etymology, phonetics, and grammar.

=== Post-vedic sutras ===
Example of sutras from Vedanta Sutra

अथातो ब्रह्मजिज्ञासा ॥१.१.१॥
जन्माद्यस्य यतः ॥ १.१.२॥
शास्त्रयोनित्वात् ॥ १.१.३॥
तत्तुसमन्वयात् ॥ १.१.४॥
ईक्षतेर्नाशब्दम् ॥ १.१.५॥

— Brahma Sutra 1.1.1–1.1.5

Some examples of sutra texts in various schools of Hindu philosophy include

- Brahma Sutras (or Vedanta Sutra) – a Sanskrit text, composed by Badarayana, likely sometime between 200 BCE to 200 CE. The text contains 555 sutras in four chapters that summarize the philosophical and spiritual ideas in the Upanishads. It is one of the foundational texts of the Vedānta school of Hindu philosophy.
- Yoga Sutras – contains 196 sutras on Yoga including the eight limbs and meditation. The Yoga Sutras were compiled around 400 CE by Patanjali, taking materials about yoga from older traditions. The text has been highly influential on Indian culture and spiritual traditions, and it is among the most translated ancient Indian text in the medieval era, having been translated into about forty Indian languages.
- Samkhya Sutra – is a collection of major Sanskrit texts of the Samkhya school of Hindu philosophy, including the sutras on dualism of Kapila. It consists of six books with 526 sutras.

Sutra, without commentary:
Soul is, for there is no proof that it is not. (Sutra 1, Book 6) This is different from the body because of its heterogeneity. (Sutra 2, Book 6) Also, because it is expressed by means of the sixth case. (Sutra 3, Book 6)

With Vijnanabhiksu's commentary bhasya filled in:
Soul is, for there is no proof that it is not, since we are aware of "I think", because there is no evidence to defeat this. Therefore, all that is to be done is to discriminate it from things in general. (Sutra 1, Book 6) This soul is different from the body because of the heterogeneousness or complete difference between the two. (Sutra 2, Book 6) Also because it, the Soul, is expressed by means of the sixth case, for the learned express it by the possessive case in such examples as 'this is my body', 'this my understanding'; for the possessive case would be unaccountable if there were absolute non-difference, between the body or the like, and the Soul to which it is thus attributed as a possession. (Sutra 3, Book 6)

— Kapila in Samkhya Sutra, Translated by James Robert Ballantyne
- Vaisheshika Sutra – the foundational text of the Vaisheshika school of Hinduism, dated to between the 4th century BCE and 1st century BCE, authored by Kanada. With 370 sutras, it aphoristically teaches non-theistic naturalism, epistemology, and its metaphysics. The first two sutras of the text expand as, "Now an explanation of Dharma; The means to prosperity and salvation is Dharma."
- Nyaya Sutras – an ancient text of Nyaya school of Hindu philosophy composed by Akṣapada Gautama, sometime between the 6th century BCE and 2nd century CE. It is notable for focusing on knowledge and logic, and making no mention of Vedic rituals. The text includes 528 aphoristic sutras, about rules of reason, logic, epistemology, and metaphysics.. These sutras are divided into five books, with two chapters in each book. The first book is structured as a general introduction and table of contents of sixteen categories of knowledge. Book two is about pramana (epistemology), book three is about prameya or the objects of knowledge, and the text discusses the nature of knowledge in the remaining books.

Reality is truth (prāma, foundation of correct knowledge), and what is true is so, irrespective of whether we know it is, or are aware of that truth.

— Akṣapada Gautama in Nyaya Sutra, Translated by Jeaneane D Fowler
- Mimamsa Sutras – the foundational text of the Mimamsa school of Hinduism, authored by Jaimini. It emphasizes the early part of the Vedas, i.e., rituals and religious works, as a means to salvation. The school emphasized precision in the selection of words, construction of sentences, developed rules for hermeneutics of language and any text, adopted and then refined principles of logic from the Nyaya school, and developed extensive rules for epistemology. An atheistic school that supported external Vedic sacrifices and rituals, its Mimamsa Sutra contains twelve chapters with nearly 2700 sutras.
- Dharma-sutras – of Āpastamba, Gautama, Baudhāyana, and Vāsiṣṭha
- Artha-sutras – the Niti Sutras of Chanakya and Somadeva are treatises on governance, law, economics, and politics. Versions of Chanakya Niti Sutras have been found in Sri Lanka and Myanmar. The more comprehensive work of Chanakya, the Arthashastra is itself composed in many parts, in sutra style, with the first Sutra of the ancient book acknowledging that it is a compilation of Artha-knowledge from previous scholars.
- Kama Sutra – an ancient Indian Sanskrit text on sexual and emotional fulfillment in life
- Moksha-sutras
- Shiva Sutras – fourteen verses that organize the phonemes of Sanskrit
- Narada Bhakti Sutra – a venerated Hindu sutra, reportedly spoken by the famous sage Narada
- Shandilya Bhakti Sutra – collection of one hundred bhakti sutras spoken by the Vedic sage Brahmarshi Shandilya. These sutras are also called as Shandilya Sutras.

== Buddhism ==
In Buddhism, a sutta or sutra constitutes a segment of the canonical literature. These early Buddhist sutras, unlike Hindu texts, are not aphoristic; rather, they tend to be quite lengthy. The Buddhist term sutta or sutra likely derives from Sanskrit sūkta (su + ukta), meaning "well spoken," reflecting the belief that "all that was spoken by the Lord Buddha was well-spoken". They embody the essence of sermons conveying "well-spoken" wisdom, akin to the Jain sutras.

In Chinese, these are known as 經 (pinyin: jīng). These teachings are organized as part of the Tripiṭaka, specifically referred to as the Sutta Pitaka. Numerous significant or influential Mahayana texts, such as the Platform Sutra and the Lotus Sutra, are termed sutras despite being attributed to much later authors.

In Theravada Buddhism, suttas constitute the second "basket" (pitaka) of the Pāli Canon. Rewata Dhamma and Bhikkhu Bodhi describe the Sutta Pitaka as:

The Sutta Pitaka, the second collection, brings together the Buddha's discourses spoken by him on various occasions during his active ministry of forty-five years.

== Jainism ==
In the Jain tradition, sutras are an important genre of "fixed text", which used to be memorized.

The Kalpa Sūtra is, for example, a Jain text that includes monastic rules, as well as biographies of the Jain Tirthankaras. Many sutras discuss all aspects of ascetic and lay life in Jainism. Various ancient sutras, particularly from the early 1st millennium CE, for example, recommend devotional bhakti as an essential Jain practice.

The surviving scriptures of Jaina tradition, such as the Acaranga Sutra (Agamas), exist in sutra format, as is the Tattvartha Sutra, a Sanskrit text accepted by all four Jainism sects as the most authoritative philosophical text that completely summarizes the foundations of Jainism.

== See also ==
- Ananda Sutram
- Chinese Buddhist canon
- List of suttas
- Shastra
- Sutra copying
- Sutram
- Tibetan Buddhist canon
