= Shandilya Samhita =

Treatise of Sage Shandilya

- शांडिल्य संहिता

Information
- Religion: Hinduism
- Author: Brahmarshi Shandilya
- Language: Sanskrit
- Period: Sanatana
- Sutras: Shandilya Sutras
- Verses: 3600 (Approximately)
- Pancharatra Tradition dedicated to Lord Vishnu or Krishna

Shandilya Samhita (Sanskrit: शांडिल्य संहिता) is a Sanskrit text attributed to the Vedic sage Brahmarshi Shandilya. It is treatise on Dharma, Artha, Kama, Moksha and Bhakti. It is the collection of Shandilya Sutras to the devotion of the God. It includes Sanskrit verses on spiritual devotion, it's prescribed practices, virtues of faith, wisdom and self-control, etc.

== Background ==
Devashree Narada and Maharshi Shandilya were two major followers of Pancharatra Bhakti tradition in the ancient period of the Indian Subcontinent. Devashree Narada wrote “Narada Pancharatra” for devotion of Lord Vishnu. Similarly, it is said that when Maharshi Shandilya did not find the ultimate goal even in the four Vedas, he took refuge in Pancharatra and got indescribable satisfaction from it. He then contributed towards Bhakti Sutras in the Pancharatra Tradition. He wrote "Shandilya Samhita" under Pancharatragama.

Shandilya Samhita is one of the important text that form the expansion of Pancharatra literature in Hindu tradition. It is based on Shandilya Sutras which is the earliest known text that systematized the devotional Pancharatra doctrine. "In some old texts Pancharatra Samhita is also referred as Shandilya Samhita".

Shandilya Samhita is considered as the authentic text of Smarta - Bhakti tradition in Hinduism. It had made a special contribution to the development of the Vaishnava sect. H Daniel Smith in his text "Vaishnava Iconography" has mentioned all the available Samhitas. Shandilya Samhita is one among the available Samhitas mentioned in the text.

== Description ==
In modern times, professor Anant Shastri Fadke of Government Sanskrit College, Varanasi, introduced the present version of Shandilya Samhita. It was edited by Gopinath Kaviraj and again in 1996 with a foreword by the vice chancellor Mandan Mishra of Sampoornanand Sanskrit University. The original Shandilya Samhita contains five sections (Khanda) on Dharma, Artha, Kama, Moksha and Bhakti. It is said that the first four sections of the Shandilya Samhita namely Dharma, Artha, Kama and Moksha have been lost. Only fifth section called as Bhakti Khanda has been survived. The present version of Shandilya Samhita's Bhakti Khanda has four sections. The first shloka of the first chapter in the Bhakti Khanda of the Shandilya Samhita asserts that the four lost Khandas of the Shandilya Samhita were discussed previously before the starting of the Bhakti Khanda.

भगवन्‌ भवताऽस्मभ्यं पुरुषार्थचतुष्टयम्‌ । धर्मार्थकाममोक्षाख्यैः खण्डेरुक्तं विभागशः।।

— शांडिल्य संहिता भक्ति खण्ड (१.१.१)
Translation:

O Lord, you have granted us the fourfold purpose of life. It is stated in sections by the names of Dharma, Artha, Kama and Moksha.

The Shandilya Samhita consists of approximately 3600 verses devoted to Lord Krishna. In the text Shandilya Samhita, Lord Krishna is identified as the supreme god or the ultimate truth. The text deals with the ethical behavior and the methods of sacred conduct followed by devotees. It is classified as a sāttvika text in the Muniprokta group of Pancharatra Aagama.

== Sections of Bhakti Khanda ==
There four sections in the present survived Bhakti Khanda of Shandilya Samhita. The sections are further divided into chapters. All sections have their own different numbers of chapters. There are 20, 9, 11 and 16 chapters in the first, second, third and fourth sections respectively. These chapters are the collection of the discussion of sages with the teacher Maharshi Shandilya about philosophical questions.

== Sources ==
- Kaviraj, Gopinath. The Sandilya Sanhita Bhaktikhanda. N.p., Creative Media Partners, LLC, 2023.
- Rosen, Steven. Vaisnavism. India, Motilal Banarsidass Publishers (Pvt. Limited), 1994.
- Sandilya Samhita, Bombay Sake, 1809
- Part I & II Sandilya Samhita. Edited by Pandit Ananta (Gopal Phadke, Professor, Government Sanskrit College. Benares
- Government Gazette. India, n.p, 1964.
- Maitra, Susil Kumar. Studies in Philosophy and Religion. India, Chuckervertty, Chatterjee, 1956.
- Pathak, Vishwambhar Sharan. Smārta Religious Tradition: Being a Study of the Epigraphic Data on the Smārta Religious Tradition of Northern India, C. 600 A.D. to C. 1200 A.D.. India, Kusumanjali Prakashan, 1987.
- Accessions List, South Asia. India, E.G. Smith for the U.S. Library of Congress Office, New Delhi, 1993.
- Shri Gulabravmaharaj: Sadhana aur Sahitya. N.p., Vani Prakashan.
- Śrīvāstava, Kiraṇa Kumārī. Ahirbudhnya saṃhita, saṅkshipta rūparekhā. India, Ekseleṃsa Pabliśarsa, 1993.
- Siṃha, Lakshmīśvara Prasāda. Bhāratīya darśanoṃ meṃ kāmatattva. India, Kiśora Vidyā Niketana, 1986.
- Upadhyaya, Baldeva. Vaishṇava sampradāyoṃ kā sāhitya aura siddhānta: Bhāratavarsha ke pradhāna Vaishṇava sampradāyoṃ ke sāhitya tathā siddhānta kā sāṅgopāṅga vivecana. India, Caukhambā Amarabhāratī Prakāśana, 1978.
- Śarmā, Bhāratī. Bhakti, Bhāgavata aura Mānasa ke sandarbha meṃ. India, Hindī Pracāraka Pablikeśansa, 1995.
- Choudhary, Ramswarth. Madhura rasa: svarūpa aura vikāsa. India, Rājakamala Prakāśana, 1968.
- धर्मायण, 2077 वि.सं. भाग-3, अंक 101-104. N.p., Mahavir Mandir, Patna.
- Dwivedi, Dr Shyamkant (2013). Vaishnav Tantra (in Hindi) (First ed.). Varanasi: Chaukhambha Publishers.
