= Tajjalan =

Concept of Hinduism

Tajjalān is one of the few enigmatic methods in Hinduism employed by the Upanishadic seers to describe Reality or Brahman. It is a cosmological approach to the problem of Reality in the context of creation.

== Meaning of Tajjalān ==
Tajjalān (Sanskrit: तज्जलान्) is an adjective, which means – 'absorbed and breathing in that', 'produced'. It is a compound word interpreted as equivalent to taj-ja, tal-la and tad-ana that represent the attributes of Brahman. It is the enigmatic method to describe Reality unlike the aphoristic method of the Mandukya Upanishad favoured in the later Sutra literature. Shandilya’s Upanishadic declaration:

सर्वं खल्विदं ब्रह्म तज्जलानिति शान्त उपासीत

sarvaṁ khalvidaṁ brahma tajjalān iti śānta upāsīta

All this (collectively) is Brahman, indeed: what evolves from That, what dissolves in That, what breathes or functions in That, should be closely and calmly studied…….

— Chandogya Upanishad III.14.1

In Chandogya Upanishad this word first appears, adopts the cryptic way for saying how God could be regarded as 'the origin', 'the end', and 'the life of all things'. Creation literally refers to the beginning of the present cycle but the Vedic seers believed that creation is beginning-less and a never-ending process, and that Brahman is the essence of all that exists and does not exist. Shankara gives the meaning of Tajjalān as – "From this "tad" Brahman the universe has arisen "ja", on dissolution it disappears "li" into this identical with Brahman; in the same way finally it is Brahman in whom the universe, after it is created, breathes "an" and lives - Tat-Ja-Li-An". He paraphrases tajja- with tasmad brahmano jatam because jan construed with tad-as can take the suffix da, so as to give the derivative tajja-.

== Implications ==
Tajjalān is a riddle that describes positively the three basic attributes of Brahman concerning explaining the process of creation etc. from the primeval Atman. Taittiriya Upanishad II.1/ III.1 proposes the Theory of the emanation of the elements from Brahman, the same Upanishad defines Brahman as Existence, Consciousness, and Infinity and declares “that alone might be regarded as the Ultimate Reality of things, from which all these beings are born, by which they live when born, to which they repair and into which they are finally resolved”, because behind the cosmos there must be an existence which must be regarded as responsible for its origin, sustenance, and absorption. Shandilya, through the use of the term, Tajjalān, reveals the secret name by which Brahman should be worshipped. Badarayana defines Brahman as – जन्माद्यस्य यतः (Janamādi asaya yatah) (Brahma Sutra I.1.2)– meaning, "That (is Brahman) from which (are derived) the birth, etc. of this (universe)", in which regard Adi Shankara states that the phrase, janamādi is a bahuvrihi compound where the subject presented is apprehended along with its attributes. This definition of Brahman is called, Tatasthalakshana.

== Significance ==
Tajjalān is the mysterious name of the universe as identified with Brahman which word summarises the three attributes of Brahman - as creator, preserver and destroyer of the universe, and presents the universe as non-different from Brahman in all three periods, past, present and future This is the cosmological proof for the existence of God, which also means that the individual soul is non-limited in its essential nature even though owing to abundance of ignorance it acquires various names and forms to become limited. The phrase, Tajjalān, supplies the reason to explain the mahavakya - "All this is Brahman". This phrase is one of the two well-known examples of the cosmological approach to the problem of Reality. Shandilya’s declaration – सर्वं खल्विदं ब्रह्म तज्जलानिति शान्त उपासीत, recommending meditation on Brahman with the aid of the word, Tajjalān, which word as a compressed formula summarizes the three attributes of the changeless Brahman, draws attention to the fact that the act of meditation (upāsita) must have an object to meditate upon.
