= Udgitha (Samaveda) =

Vedic meditation and chanting

Udgitha (Sanskrit: उद्गीथ) is a Vedic Sanskrit term in the ancient text Samaveda. It refers to a form of meditation on the Vedic syllable Om and its aloud chanting. In the text Samaveda, the Udgitha is a portion that starts with the syllable Om. It is sung in a special manner. The term Udgitha has multifaceted essences in different Vedic texts. The learning about the knowledge of Udgitha is called as Udgitha Vidya. It is detailed in the texts of the branches of Chhandogas as well as Vajasaneyi.

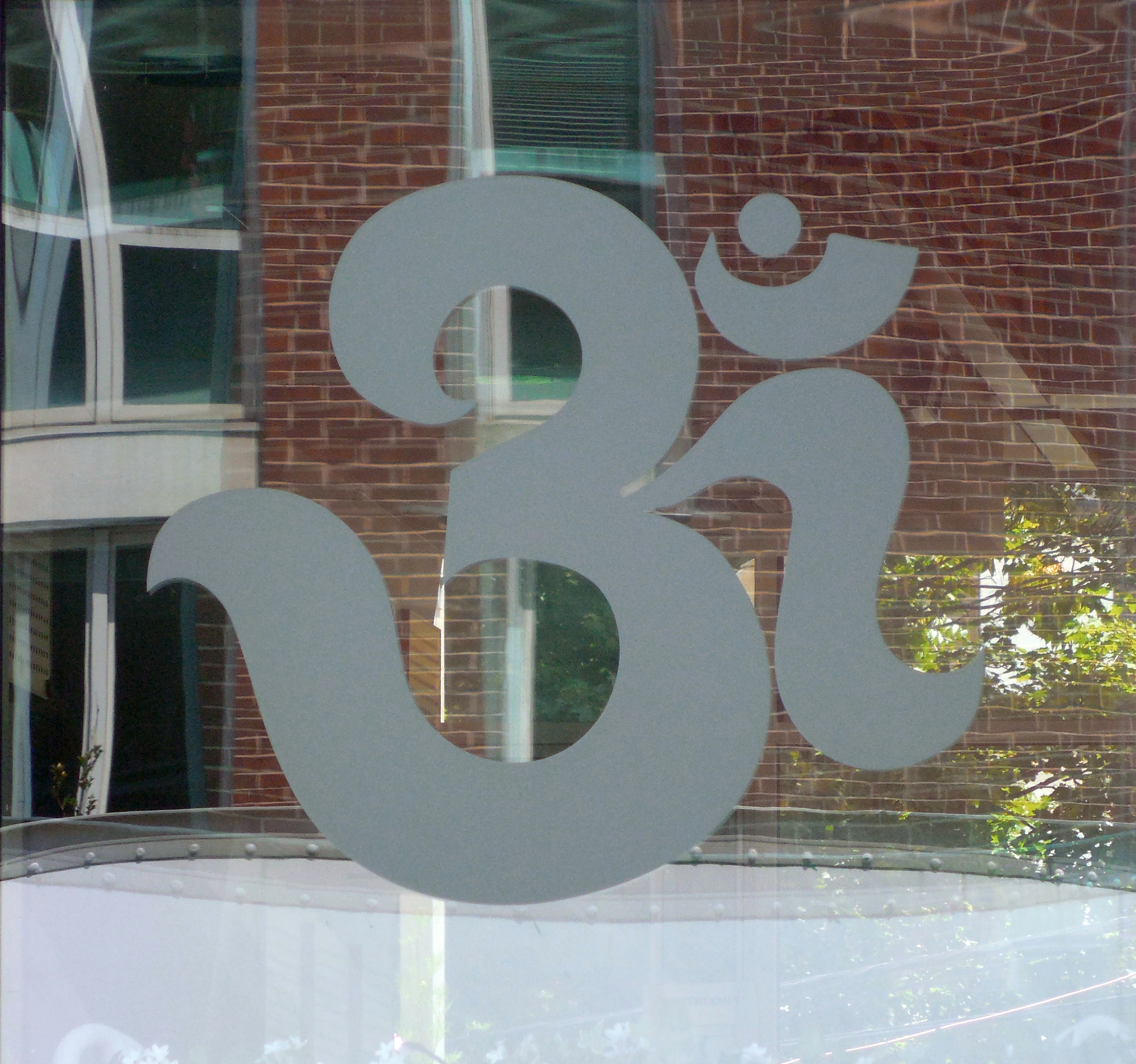
View of an iconic symbol of Om.

In the text Chandogya Upanishad, Atidhanvā Śaunaka taught the Udgitha Vidya to his disciple Udara Shandilya. During his teachings, he suggested his disciple that as long as members of your family understand this Udgitha, their lives in this world will be truly magnificent.
