= Shandilya Rishi Mandir =

Temple dedicated to Shandilya Rishi

- शांडिल्य ऋषि मन्दिर

Religion
- Affiliation: Hinduism
- District: Kullu district
- Deity: Rishi Shandilya

Location
- Location: Shalin village
- State: Himachal Pradesh
- Country: India

Shandilya Rishi Mandir (Devanagari: शांडिल्य ऋषि मंदिर) is a Hindu temple dedicated to the Vedic sage Brahmarshi Shandilya. It is located at Shalin village in the Kullu district of the Himachal Pradesh in India. The new temple was built in the year 2014. The consecration of the temple was held on 14 December 2014. According to the legend of Shalin village, the sage Shandilya is the presiding deity of the village.

== Description ==
According to the caretaker Keshav Thakur of the temple, Shandilya Rishi is the presiding deity of Ujji valley. The Fagli festival is a major festival celebrated in the temple of the sage Shandilya. In the festival, it is believed that with the divine power of Sage Shandilya and the traditional divine tunes by the villagers drive out the demonic powers from their area.

The nearby villages around the Shandilya Rishi Mandir are also famous for other several deities in Hinduism. The villages are specialised and known for some particular deities in the tradition of the Sanatana Dharma in the Indian subcontinent. They are Lord Ganesha from Ghuddaur, Lord Vishnu from Sajla, Sandhya Gayatri from Jagatsukh, Phali Nag from Bhanara, Shirghan Nag from Preeni, Srishti Narayan from Aleu, Parashar Rishi from Kulang, Kanchan Nag from Gaushal, Vyasa Rishi, Gautam Rishi, Shankh Narayan from Nasogi, Siyali Mahadev from Sial, Kartik Swami from Simsa, Veernath from Parsha and similarly Ghatotkach, Mata Hidimba, and Manu Rishi from the Banjar Valley. These villages also collaborates for organising some common festivals at some common legendary places of the villages.
