= Shitala Mata Mandir =

Shitala Devi temple in Sandila

Coordinates: 27°04′16″N 80°30′17″E

- शीतला माता मन्दिर

Religion
- Affiliation: Hinduism
- District: Hardoi district
- Deity: Goddess Shitala

Location
- Location: Sandila
- State: Uttar Pradesh
- Country: India

Architecture
- Founder: Shandilya Rishi
- Tapobhumi of the Vedic sage Shandilya

Shitala Mata Mandir (Hindi: शीतला माता मन्दिर) is an ancient Hindu temple located in the Sandila town of Uttar Pradesh in India. The temple is dedicated to Goddess Shitala. According to legend, the Vedic sage Shandilya did penance in the temple. It is also known as Shandilya Rishi Tapobhumi.

== History ==
Shitala Mata is the presiding goddess of the Sandila town. It is believed that in the ancient period the Vedic sage Shandilya did a long meditation in the devotion of the Goddess Shitala. There was Shandilya Ashram in the vicinity of the temple. The ashram of Shandilya is considered as the part of Naimisharanya Teerth. The present temple is thousand years old. Apart from the Shitala Mata Mandir, there are other half an dozen temples of different deities in the campus of the main temple. These are Ram Janaki Mandir, Thakurji Mandir, Hanuman Mandir, and Shiva Mandir, etc.
