= Shandilya Ashram =

Ashramas of Brahmarshi Shandilya

- शांडिल्य आश्रम
- Indian subcontinent

Information
- Other names: Shandilya Gurukul
- Type: Gurukula
- Religious affiliation: Hinduism
- Founded: Vedic period
- Founder: Brahmarshi Shandilya

Shandilya Ashram (Sanskrit: शांडिल्य आश्रम) refers to the residence place and the Gurukul founded by the Vedic sage Brahmarshi Shandilya. In the Indian subcontinent, there are several locations known as Shandilya Ashram. These locations are believed to be the residence places, educational institutions or penance sites related to the sage Shandilya. In the ancient Hindu texts, the sage Shandilya has been described as a renowned acharya of Vedas and spiritual teachings. He travelled different parts of the Indian subcontinent to spread Vedic and spiritual learning. During his journey, he stayed at several locations in the subcontinent where he preached his Vedic and spiritual knowledges. These locations are known as Shandilya Ashram.

== Description ==
In ancient times, Shandilya Ashram was known for its residential education centre, where disciples came to learn Sanskrit and Vedic studies. The disciples had to live in the ashram for a certain time period. They were taught Vedic studies in the guidance of the Acharya Shandilya.

In Mahabharata, the sage Shandilya was the kulguru of the Nand Dynasty in Gokul. His ashram was located at nandgaon village in the territory of Gokul. According to legend, Lord Krishna choose the sage Shandilya as his teacher to gain knowledge from him on the occasion of Purnima in Ashadha month. This Purnima is celebrated as Guru Purnima by the Hindu adherents.

== Locations ==
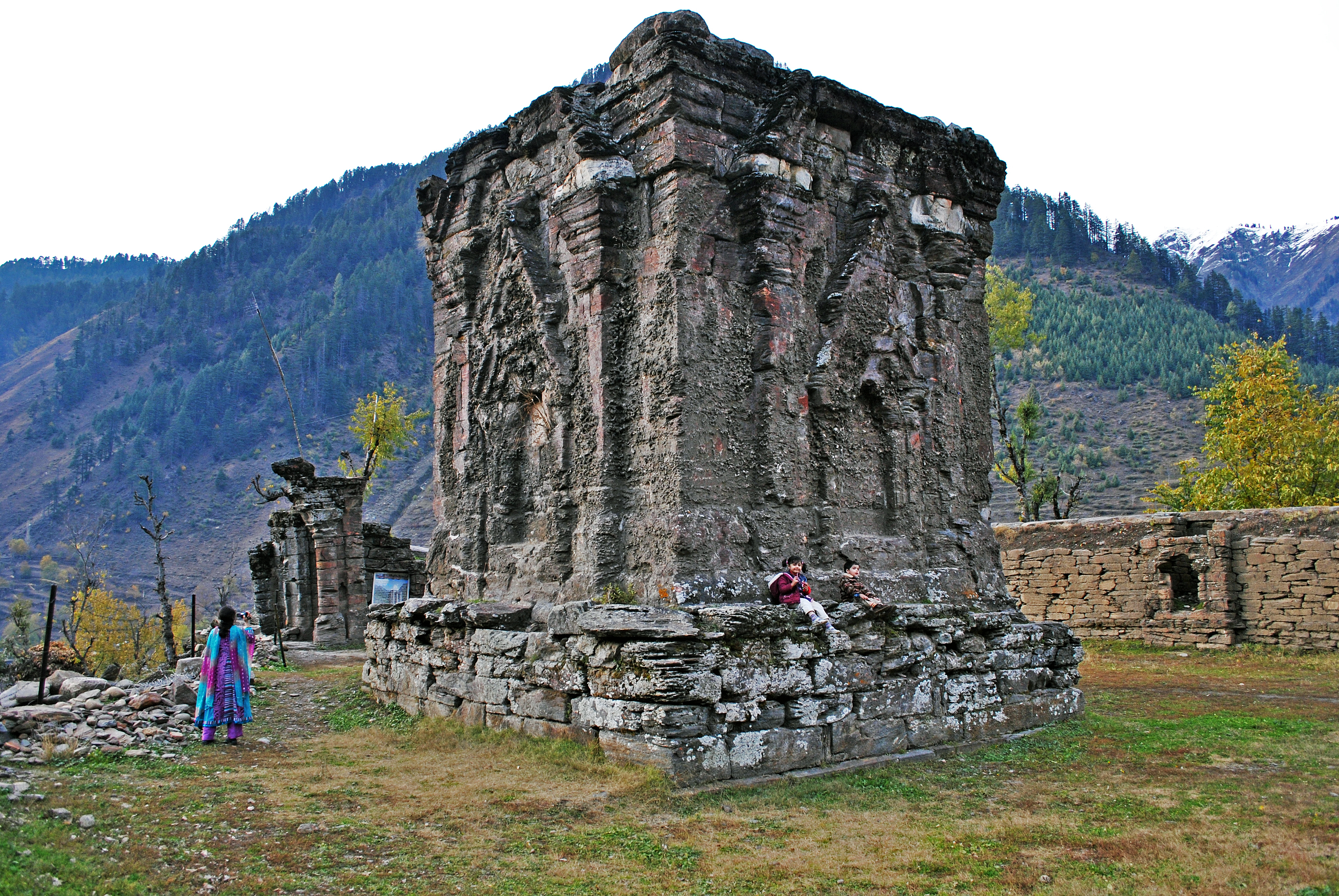
View of the ruins of Sharada Peetha, believed to be the meditation place of the sage Shandilya

According to legend, the Sharada Peetha in the Kashmir region is believed to be the meditation place of the sage Shandilya. It is said that after prolonged penance, he had a vision of Goddess Sharada near the Tejuvan village in the vicinity of the Sharda Peeth.

Similarly, the Sandila town in Uttar Pradesh was his Tapobhumi. The place of penance of the sage Shandilya in Sandila, is considered a part of Naimisharanya Teerth. There is a Hindu temple dedicated to the Goddess Shitala. The temple is known as Shitala Mata Mandir. It is believed that the sage Shandilya performed to his penance in the temple. There is Shandilya Ashram near the temple. The town of Sandila is named after his name. In the state of Uttrakhand, there is a village known as Sani Udiyar. It is said that the Shandilya Rishi performed a tough penance in the village.

In ancient times, there was Shandilya Ashram near the sangam of Ghaghra and Saryu rivers at Sukarkhet. Presently it is located in the state of Uttar Pradesh in India. The Sukarkhet village is also claimed as the birthplace of the Awadhi poet Tulasi Das. According to the Jalalpur Mahatmya, there was Shandilya Ashram in the Jalalpur village. In the ancient period, the village was a centre for Sanskrit learning. It is mentioned in the Brahmanda Purana. Presently the Jalalpur village is in the Jalaun district of Uttar Pradesh. In the state of Madhya Pradesh, there is Sandiya Ghat on the bank of the sacred river Narmada. According to legend, the sage Shandilya performed severe penance here and received the boon of devotion and renunciation from Goddess Narmada. So the devotees arriving at Sandiya Ghat believe that performing penance at this ghat, one attains devotion and renunciation. On the sangam of Kubja and Anjani tributary rivers of Narmada, there was ashram of the sage Shandilya.

In the Brahmavana village of the Samastipur district in the Mithila region of Bihar, it is believed that during the ancient period there was an ashram of the sage Shandilya. A temple attributed to the Vedic sage Shandilya is being built at the village.

In the state of Rajasthan, the Aravali valley of the Pratapgarh district is believed to be the Tapobhumi of Shandilya Rishi in the Treta Yuga. There is a 400 years old Shiva temple known as Nilkanth Mahadev Mandir at Kherot Panchayat. According to the Mahant Mohan Bharti of the temple, there is a legend that sage Shandilya performed penance here. The nature here anoints the Shivalinga of the temple with a stream of water all year round. Since the colour of the Shivalinga is green, it is named Nilkanth Mahadev.

In the state of Maharashtra, there was an ashram of Shandilya Rishi in the Chakan town of the Pune district. It was located at the campus of the Chakreshwar Mahadev Mandir. In the premises of the temple, there is Samadhi Sthal Mandir of the sage Shandilya. According to legend, it is believed that Shandilya Rishi lived his last moments at this place.
