= Barai (caste) =

Hindu caste in India

Regions with significant populations
- India

Languages
- Hindi; Awadhi

Religion
- Hinduism

The Barai are a Hindu caste found in Uttar Pradesh, India. The people of this community mainly uses "Chaurasia" as surname (or 'title').
