= Shandilya Smriti =

Smriti text of Shandilya

- शांडिल्य स्मृति

Information
- Religion: Hinduism
- Author: Shandilya (Rishi)
- Language: Sanskrit
- Law book of Shandilya

Shandilya Smriti (Sanskrit: शाण्डिल्यस्मृति) (Romanised: Śāṇḍilyasmṛti) also known as Shandilya Dharmashastra is a traditional Hindu scripture that provide guidelines on dharma of moral and ethical duties. It is attributed to the Vedic sage Sandilya. It provides information on various aspects of life, including rituals, duties, and social conduct. It is also called the "Law book of Shandilya" or "The Code of Śāṇḍilya".

== Description ==
The Indian philosopher Vedanta Desika (13th-14th century CE ) in his writing cited Shandilya Smriti while explaining the devotional service to the God by a devotee. He quoted Shandilya Smriti for the citation as "The God should be served in the same way as a faithful wife serves her beloved husband, a mother serves her infant child, a disciple serves his teacher and a friend serves his friend. Lakshmipati (Lord Vishnu) should always be seen as a Guru, friend, teacher, father and mother."

The Indian scholar Brahma Dutt Shastri compiled fifty six Smriti texts in his six volumes series text Smriti Sandarbha published by Gurumandal Series. Shandilya Smriti is the 50th Smriti text compiled in the Smriti Sandarbha by the scholar Brahma Dutt Shastri. It is the part of 5th volume in the Smriti Sandarbha of Gurumandal Series.

== Contents ==
Shandilya Smriti text is divided into five chapters. The first chapter is Acharavarnam. This chapter is related to the code of conduct. In this chapter there are 122 Shlokas. The second chapter is Pratah Kritavarnam. In this chapter, the conducts and duties of human lives after waking from the bed in the morning are discussed. It consists 91 Shlokas. The third chapter is Upaadaanvidhivarnam. It has 163 Shlokas. The fourth chapter is Ijyaachaaravarnam. It is the largest chapter having 242 Shlokas. The fifth chapter is Raatraavantyayaame Yogakritavarnam. It is the smallest chapter having 81 Shlokas. The total number of Shlokas in the entire Shandilya Smriti text is 699.
