= Chakreshwar Mahadev Mandir, Chakan =

Ancient Shiva temple in Maharashtra

Chakreshwar Mahadev Mandir
- चक्रेश्वर महादेव मंदिर

Religion
- Affiliation: Hinduism
- District: Pune
- Deity: Lord Shiva

Location
- State: Maharashtra
- Country: India
- Interactive map of Chakreshwar Mahadev Mandir
- Coordinates: 18.7594839°N 73.8681171°E
- Samadhi of the Vedic sage Shandilya

Chakreshwar Mahadev Mandir (Marathi: चक्रेश्वर महादेव मंदिर) is an ancient temple dedicated to Lord Shiva in the state of Maharashtra in India. It is located in the Chakan town of the Pune district in Maharashtra. In the premises of the temple, there is a legendary samadhi of the Vedic sage Shandilya. According to legend, it is believed that the Vedic sage Shandilya had lived his last moments of life at this site. In ancient period there was an ashram of the sage Shandilya. The present architecture of the temple was built during the 13th to 18th century CE. It was patronised by the Maratha rulers in the region. During the Mahashivratri festival, a large number of devotees flock here to worship the Shivalinga of the temple.
