= Brahmarshi =

Highest class of Hindu sages

In Hinduism, a Brahmarshi (Sanskrit brahmarṣi, a tatpurusha compound of brahma and ṛṣi) is a member of the highest class of Rishis ("seers" or "sages"). A Brahmarshi is a sage who has attained enlightenment and became a Jivanmukta by completely understanding the meaning of Brahman and has attained the highest divine knowledge (omniscience) and self knowledge called Brahmajnana. When a Brahmarshi dies he attains Paramukti and frees himself from Samsara, the cycle of birth and death.

== Order ==
The superlative title of Brahmarshi is not attested in the Vedas themselves and first appears in the Sanskrit epics.

According to this classification, a Brahmarshi is the ultimate expert of religion and spiritual knowledge known as 'Brahmajnana'. Below him are the Maharishis (Great Rishis).

The Saptarishis created out of Brahma's thoughts are perfect brahmarshis. They are often cited to be at par with the Devas in power and piety in the Puranas.

Bhrigu, Angiras, Atri, Vishwamitra, Kashyapa, Vasishta, and Shandilya are the seven brahmarshis. But there is another list of Saptarishi also who are also Gotra-pravartakas, i.e., founders of Brahamanical clans, and this second list appeared somewhat later, but belongs to ancient period.

All the hymns of third mandala of the Rig Veda, including the Gayatri mantra, are ascribed to Vishwamitra, who is mentioned as the son of Gaadhi. Vishwamitra is also referred to Kaushika due to his patrilineal lineage using the suffix -ka as "descendant" or "pertaining to".

Parasurama and Jamadagni have also been credited the title of Brahmarishi by Bhishma as in Mahabharata.

== The Period of the Manusmriti ==
Brahmarshi-desha, 'the country of the holy sages,' includes the territories of the Kurus, Matsyas, Panchalas and Surasenas (i.e. the eastern half of the State of Patiala and of the Delhi division of the Punjab, the Alwar State and adjacent territory in Rajputana, the region which lies between the Ganges and the Jumna, and the Mathura District in the United Provinces).

== See also ==
- Brahmavarta
- Brahmana
- Brahmaloka
- Brahmastra
- Brahmanda astra
- Brahmanda Purana
- Brahma Sampradaya
- Brahma Samhita
- Brahma Sutras
- Brahma Vaivarta Purana
- Manasputra
- Hindu texts
- Vedic priesthood
- Vedanga
- Hindu mythology
