= Shandilya (Rishi) =

Ancient Indian sage

Brahmarshi Shandilya
- शांडिल्य

Personal life
- Cremation place: Chakreshwar Mahadev Mandir, Chakan
- Parent: Devala (father)
- Era: Vedic Period
- Notable idea(s): Brahman, Tajjalan
- Known for: Shandilya Vidya, Shandilya Upanishad, Shandilya Samhita, Shandilya Bhakti Sutra and Shandilya Smriti
- Occupation: Acharya

Religious life
- Religion: Hinduism
- Institute: Shandilya Ashram
- Sect: Vaishnava, Shaiva, Shakta
- Movement: Bhakti
- Dharma name: Sanatana

Shandilya (IAST: Śāṇḍilya, Sanskrit: शाण्डिल्य) was a Vedic Rishi and was the progenitor of the Śāṇḍilya gotra. The name derives from the Sanskrit words Śaṇ (roughly, Full), and Dilam (Moon), thus meaning Full Moon, therefore implying Śhāṇḍilya had great devotion towards the Moon God. His descendants have a direct descent from the Chandravamsha and a matrilineal descent from the Suryavamsha.

== Description ==
Śhāṇḍilya is the son of the great sage Devala, the nephew of Surya, through his mother Devadutta and the grandson of Maharishi Kashyapa. He is associated with the Shatapatha Brahmana (X.vi.iii.1) of the Shukla Yajurveda, with the Chandogya Upanishad (III.xiv.1) associated with the Kauthuma shākhā of the Samaveda, and with the Brihadaranyaka Upanishad (X.vi.3) which is the concluding part of the Shatapatha Brahmana. He was also known as "Udara- Śāṇḍilya", and the disciple of Atidhanvān Śaunaka who taught him about the greatness and the limitlessness of Brahman. The learning about the meditation and aloud chanting of the syllable Om, which represents the symbol of the ultimate Brahman, he learned from his teacher Shaunaka is known as Udgitha Vidya. He is one of the most prominent metaphysical philosophers. He concludes that the essence of the soul is consciousness and that the determinate (the body, the individual, the seeker) finds its ultimate resting place in the indeterminate (Purusha, Brahman) as the indeterminate.

Shandilya's other Acharyas include Kaushika, Gautama Maharishi, Kaishorya Kaapya, Vatsya Vaijavap, and Kushri. Shandilya's disciples include Kaundinya, Agnivesha, Vatsya Vamakakshayan, Vaishthapureya, and Bharadwaj. He composed the Shandilya Upanishad.

Families who claim his direct paternal lineage can be found significantly throughout India. Many Saraswat Brahmin families residing in North India claim Shandilya as their paternal ancestor. Shandilya's devotion towards Lord Chandra is widely known by most but what isn't known by many is that Indumati, granddaughter of Shandilya, married Shatayu, the great grandson of Chandradeva. The couple moved towards the state of modern-day Odisha. They never ruled like their counterparts and lived ascetic lives, as did their descendants. As Mahapadma Nanda overthrew all the legendary dynasties in India, it was no longer safe for their descendants to claim direct patrilineal descent from Chandravamsha, since it would challenge the claim of the former. This line has then merged with Kshatriyas in Odisha and then moved down further to Andhra Pradesh. Today their descendants continue to live under Shandilya gotra.

He has been credited with writing the Shandilya Bhakti Sutra. According to the Bhagavata Purana, he was instrumental in resolving certain metaphysical doubts of King Parikshit of Hastinapura and King Vajra of Dwaraka.

== Teachings ==
Śāṇḍilya Vidya is a set of teachings of vidyā or philosophy by the ancient Hindu sage Śāṇḍilya. It is part of the Agnirahasyama of the Shatapatha Upanishad, and its precepts are also set out in the Chandogya Upanishad. The work treats of the universal Absolute (Brahman) and of the practice of faith (Bhakti).

=== The Śāṇḍilya Vidya ===
The Śāṇḍilya Vidya is described in the following four passages in the Chandogya Upanishad (III.xiv.1-4) wherein Śāṇḍilya provides the cosmological proof of the Absolute or Brahman, the supreme life-principle, from whom and within which emerge, function, evolve and dissolve all beings and things. Śāṇḍilya states:-

सर्वं खल्विदं ब्रह्म तज्जलानिति शान्त उपासीत । अथ खलु क्रतुमयः पुरुषो यथाक्रतुरस्मिँल्लोके पुरुषो भवति तथेतः प्रेत्य भवति स क्रतुं कुर्वीत ॥ १ ॥

1. " All this is Brahman. From It the universe comes forth, in It the universe merges and in It the universe breathes. Therefore a man should meditate on Brahman with a calm mind. Now, verily, a man consists of will. As he wills in this world, so does he become when he has departed hence. Let him with this knowledge in mind form his will. "

मनोमयः प्राणशरीरो भारूपः सत्यसङ्कल्प आकाशात्मा सर्वकर्मा सर्वकामः सर्वगन्धः सर्वरसः सर्वमिदमभ्यत्तोऽवाक्यनादरः ॥ २ ॥
एष म आत्मान्तर्हृदयेऽणीयान्व्रीहेर्वा यवाद्वा सर्षपाद्वा श्यामाकाद्वा श्यामाकतण्डुलाद्वैष म आत्मान्तर्हृदये ज्यायान्पृथिव्या ज्यायानन्तरिक्षाज्ज्यायान्दिवो ज्यायानेभ्यो लोकेभ्यः ॥ ३ ॥

2-3. " He who consists of the mind, whose body is subtle, whose form is light, whose thoughts are true, whose nature is like the akasa, whose creation in this universe, who cherishes all righteous desires, who contains all pleasant odours, who is endowed with all tastes, who embraces all this, who never speaks and who is without longing— He is my Self within the heart, smaller than a grain of rice, smaller than a grain of barley, smaller than a mustard seed, smaller than a grain of millet; He is my Self within the heart, greater than the earth, greater than the mid—region, greater than heaven, greater than all these worlds. "

सर्वकर्मा सर्वकामः सर्वगन्धः सर्वरसः सर्वमिदमभ्यात्तोऽवाक्यनादर एष म आत्मान्तर्हृदय एतद्ब्रह्मैतमितः प्रेत्याभिसंभवितास्मीति यस्य स्यादद्धा न विचिकित्सास्तीति ह स्माह शाण्डिल्यः शाण्डिल्यः ॥ ४ ॥

4. " He whose creation is this universe, who cherishes all desires, who contains all odours, who is endowed with all tastes, who embraces all this, who never speaks and who is without longing—He is my Self within the heart, He is that Brahman. When I shall have departed hence I shall certainly reach Him: one who has this faith and has no doubt will certainly attain to that Godhead. Thus said Sandilya, yea, thus he said. "

In these four passages Śāṇḍilya gives us the cosmological proof of the Absolute, the Universal Ātmān or Tajjalān (Sanskrit:तज्जलान). It is that from which things are born, in which they live and repair. According to one's own karma in this life is shaped the life in the next world. The Ātmān is a positive entity, both great and small, infinite and infinitesimal, surely reachable after death. That Universal Ātmān resides in the heart of all as the individual self. My soul is Brahman. He describes in a positive way the process of creation from the Ātmān, Tajjalān is the universe identified with the changeless Brahman, who is not bound by space and time, having three attributes – creator, preserver and destroyer of the universe, and that the individual self is Brahman in its essential nature. All this is Brahman.

The Śāṇḍilya Vidya is part of the Agnirahasyama of the Shatapatha Upanishad, briefly described in the following two passages (SB X.vi.iii.1-2):-

1. "Let him meditate upon the 'true Brahman.' Now, man here, indeed, is possessed of understanding, and according to how great his understanding is when he departs this world, so does he, on passing away, enter yonder world."

2. "Let him meditate on the Self, which is made up of intelligence, and endowed with a body of spirit, with a form of light, and with an ethereal nature, which changes its shape at will, is swift as thought, of true resolve, and true purpose, which consists of all sweet odours and tastes, which holds sway over all the regions and pervades this whole universe, which is speechless and indifferent; even as a grain of rice, or a grain of barley, or a grain of millet, or the smallest granule of millet, so is this golden Purusha in the heart; even as a smokeless light, it is greater than the sky, greater than the ether, greater than the earth, greater than all existing things;--that self of the spirit (breath) is my self: on passing away from hence I shall obtain that self. Verily, whosoever has this trust, for him there is no uncertainty. Thus spake Sandilya, and so it is."

Here, it is most comprehensively explained that the Ātmān within the body and the mind etc., is the same as the all-pervading Purusha who is the source, support, power and light of entire creation. The first formulation of Hindu idea of God found in the Shatapatha Brahmana is repeated in Sandilya Vidya. The sage addresses Ishvara (God) as Atman or Purusha or Brahman as the 'creator' and 'overlord' of all things that have been and are to be. The Sandilya Doctrine of Bhakti (faith), called Sandilya Vidya by Vedantasara, lays stress on devotional meditations directed towards Saguna Brahman i.e. Brahman viewed as possessed of qualities.

Yajnavalkya extends the doctrine of the same immortal soul in each being by explaining that the soul, which is Brahman consisting of consciousness, mind, etc., based on desire passes from one body to another; the one who is without desire is not reborn and becomes Brahman.

== See also ==
- Shandilya Samhita
- Shandilya Upanishad
- Shandilya Gotra
- Shandilya Bhakti Sutra
- Shandilya Smriti
- Shandilya Rishi Mandir
- Shitala Mata Mandir, Sandila
