= Shandilya Bhakti Sutra =

Treatise of Shandilya Sutras

- शाण्डिडल्यभक्तिसूत्रम्

Information
- Religion: Hinduism
- Author: Shandilya (Rishi)
- Language: Sanskrit
- Sutras: 100 Shandilya Sutras
- The text of Shandilya Sutras

Shandilya Bhakti Sutra (Sanskrit: शाण्डिडल्यभक्तिसूत्रम्) is an ancient Sanskrit text of devotion to the God in Hinduism composed by the Vedic sage Brahmarshi Shandilya. It is the collection of one hundred bhakti sutras of the sage Shandilya. These one hundred bhakti sutras are collectively called as Shandilya Sutras.

== Description ==
Maharishi Shandilya was a great teacher of devotion and a supreme devotee of Lord Vishnu. He composed hundred of Sutras dedicated to the devotion of God in Hinduism. These Sutras are called as Shandilya Sutras and the text of these Shandilya Sutras is called as Shandilya Bhakti Sutra. According to the scholars, the text Shandilya Bhakti Sutra seems more older than similar text Narada Bhakti Sutra because Shandilya is quoted in the text Narada Bhakti Sutra but Narada is not quoted in the Shandilya Bhakti Sutra.

There are two well known commentaries on the Shandilya Bhakti Sutra, they are Shandilyasutram by the philosopher Svapneśvara and Bhakti Chandrika of Nārāyaṇatīrtha.

== Contents ==
In the text Shandilya Bhakti Sutra, there are three chapters. Each chapter is divided into two lectures known as Ahnika in Sanskrit. The literal meaning of Ahnika is daily lesson or lecture. The first chapter is about the nature of devotion, the second chapter is related to the means of devotion and the third chapter is related to the object of worship. There are 9 and 17 sutras in the first and second lectures respectively of the first chapter. In the second chapter, there are 29 sutras in each lectures. In the last chapter, there are 8 sutras in each lectures. The total number of sutras in the text is one hundred.
