= Brahman =

Metaphysical concept, unchanging Ultimate Reality in Hinduism

Om signifies the essence of Brahman, the ultimate reality.

In the Historical Vedic religion and Hinduism, Brahman (Sanskrit: ब्रह्मन्; IAST: Brahman) has a "variety of meanings", but in the Upanishads and later Indian philosophies it connotes 'That' from which all existence proceeds, and to which everything returns, (Note: See Brahma Sutras I.1.2) the origin and cause of all that exists. In contemporary Hindu metaphysics it is the highest universal principle, the Ultimate reality of the universe.

Brahman is a concept found in the Vedas, and it is extensively discussed in the early Upanishads, with a variety of meanings. According to Gavin Flood, the concept of Brahman evolved and expanded from the power of sound, words, and rituals in Vedic times to the "deeper foundation of all phenomena," the "essence of the self (Atman, Self)," and the deeper "truth of a person beyond apparent difference." Other scholars such as Barbara Holdrege, Hananya Goodman, and Jan Gonda, contend that the earliest Vedic verses suggest that this ancient meaning was never the only meaning, and the concept evolved and expanded in ancient India.

In the Upanishads, the concept of Brahman evolves to encompass metaphysical, ontological, and soteriological themes. Brahman is described as the unchanging "primordial reality" that creates, sustains, and ultimately withdraws the universe within itself, the final element in a dialectical process which cannot be eliminated or annihilated. (Note: "not sublatable", German: "aufheben".) Brahman is also portrayed as the "divine being" or "Lord," which may manifest as either a distinct deity or as an immanent presence within all individuals. It represents the "knowledge" that leads to spiritual liberation, the "Self."

Brahman is discussed in Hindu texts in relation to the concept of Atman (Sanskrit: आत्मन्, 'Self'), personal, (Note: Saguna Brahman, with qualities) impersonal (Note: Nirguna Brahman, without qualities) or Para Brahman, (Note: Supreme) or in various combinations of these qualities depending on the philosophical school. In dualistic schools of Hinduism such as the theistic Dvaita Vedanta, Brahman is different from Atman (Self) in each being. In non-dual schools such as the Advaita Vedanta, the substance of Brahman is identical to the substance of Atman, is everywhere and inside each living being, and there is connected spiritual oneness in all existence.

== Etymology and related terms ==
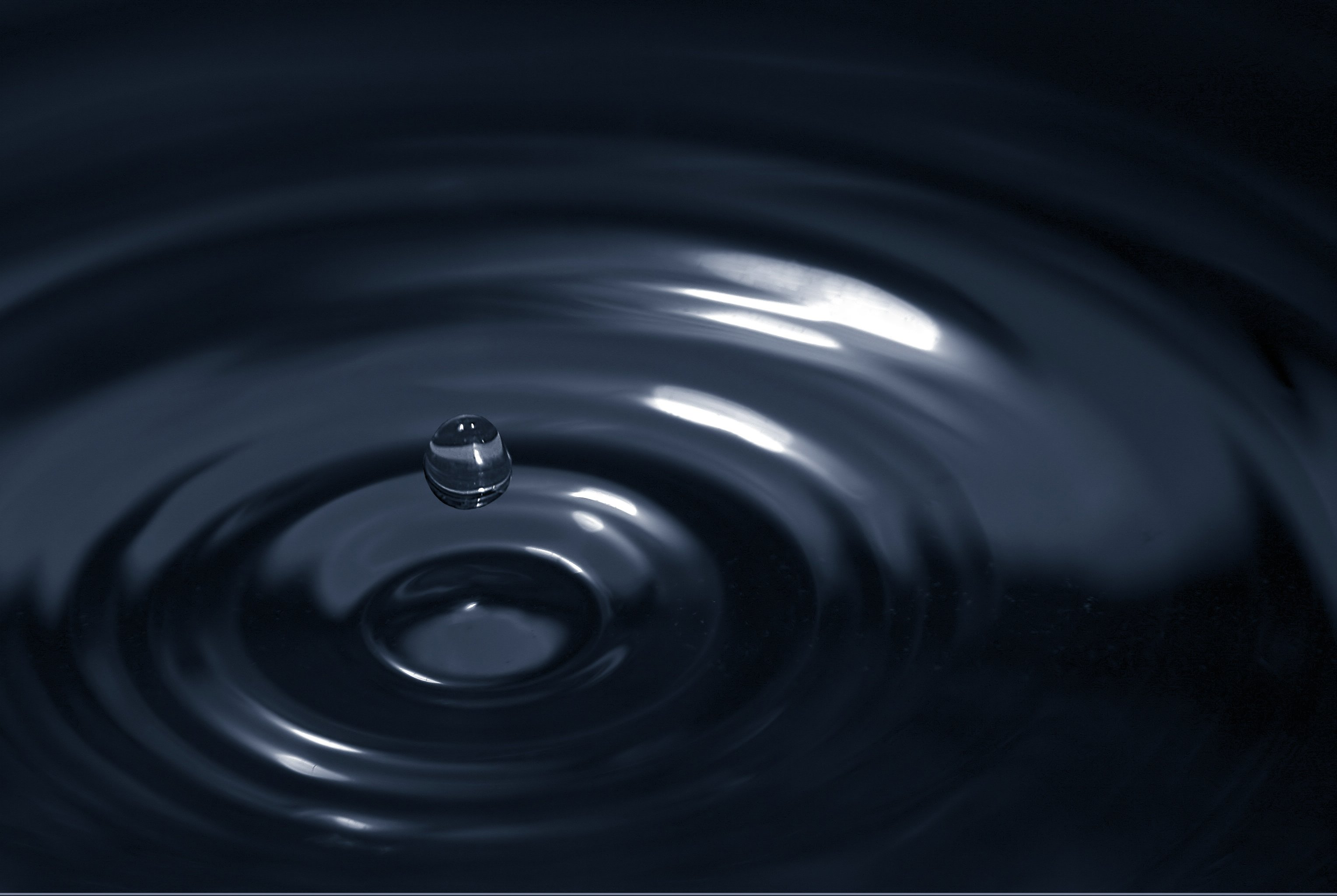
A drop in the ocean: an analogy for Ātman merging into Brahman.

Sanskrit (ब्रह्मन्) Brahman (an n-stem, nominative bráhma, from a root bṛh- "to swell, expand, grow, enlarge") is a neuter noun to be distinguished from the masculine brahmán—denoting a person associated with Brahman, and from Brahmā, the creator God in the Hindu Trinity, the Trimurti. Brahman is thus a gender-neutral concept that implies greater impersonality than masculine or feminine conceptions of the deity. Brahman is referred to as the supreme self. Puligandla states it as "the unchanging reality amidst and beyond the world", while Sinar states Brahman is a concept that "cannot be exactly defined".

In Vedic Sanskrit:

- Brahma (ब्रह्म) (nominative singular), brahman (ब्रह्मन्) (stem) (neuter gender) from root bṛh-, means "to be or make firm, strong, solid, expand, promote".
- Brahmana (ब्रह्मन) (nominative singular, never plural), from stems brha (to make firm, strong, expand) + Sanskrit -man- which denotes some manifest form of "definite power, inherent firmness, supporting or fundamental principle".

In later Sanskrit usage:

- Brahma (ब्रह्म) (nominative singular), brahman (ब्रह्मन्) (stem) (neuter gender) means the concept of the transcendent and immanent ultimate reality, Supreme Cosmic Spirit in Hinduism. The concept is central to Hindu philosophy, especially Vedanta; this is discussed below.
- Brahmā (ब्रह्मा) (nominative singular), Brahman (ब्रह्मन्) (stem) (masculine gender), means the deity or deva Prajāpati Brahmā. He is one of the members of the Hindu trinity and is associated with creation, but he does not have a cult in present-day India. This is because Brahmā, the creator-god, is long-lived but not eternal i.e. Brahmā gets absorbed back into Purusha at the end of an aeon, and is born again at the beginning of a new kalpa.

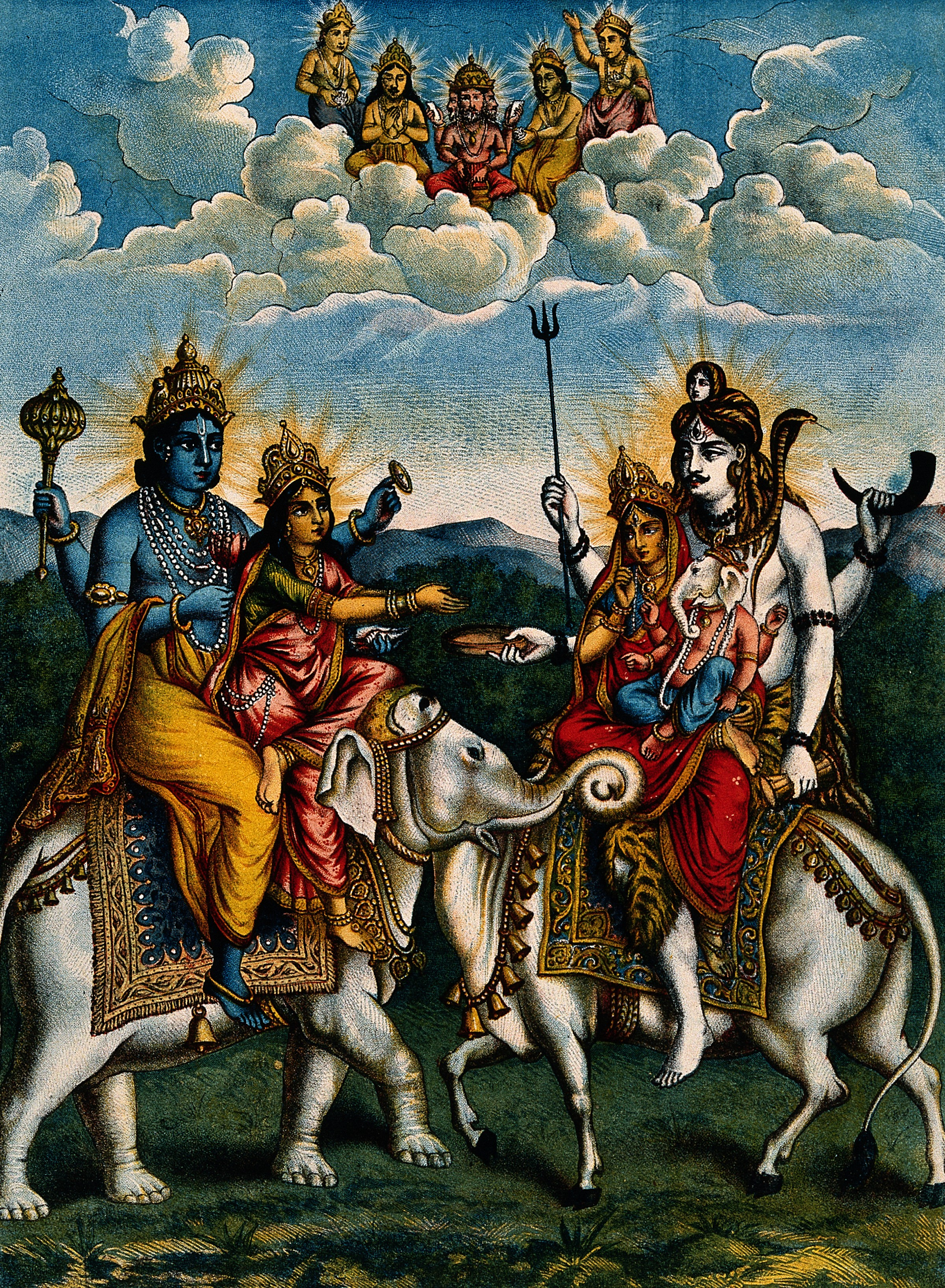
Deities Vishnu, Lakshmi, Shiva, Parvati and Ganesha. These deities have distinct and complex personalities, yet are often viewed as aspects of and are worshipped as incarnations of the same ultimate reality called Brahman. (Note: [a] Hark, Lisa; DeLisser, Horace (2011). Achieving Cultural Competency. John Wiley & Sons. "Three gods, Brahma, Vishnu, and Shiva, and other deities are considered manifestations of and are worshipped as incarnations of Brahman." [b] Toropov & Buckles 2011: The members of various Hindu sects worship a dizzying number of specific deities and follow innumerable rites in honor of specific gods. Because this is Hinduism, however, its practitioners see the profusion of forms and practices as expressions of the same unchanging reality. The panoply of deities are understood by believers as symbols for a single transcendent reality. [d] Orlando O. Espín, James B. Nickoloff (2007). An Introductory Dictionary of Theology and Religious Studies. Liturgical Press. "While Hindus believe in many devas, many are monotheistic to the extent that they will recognise only one Supreme Being, a God or Goddess who is the source and ruler of the devas.")

These are distinct from:

- A brāhmaṇa (ब्राह्मण) (masculine, pronounced [ˈbɽaːɦmɐɳɐ]), (which literally means "pertaining to prayer") is a prose commentary on the Vedic mantras—an integral part of the Vedic literature.
- A brāhmaṇa (ब्राह्मण) (masculine, same pronunciation as above), means priest; in this usage the word is usually rendered in English as "Brahmin". This usage is also found in the Atharva Veda. In neuter plural form, Brahmāṇi. See Vedic priest.
- Ishvara, (lit., Supreme Lord), in Advaita, is identified as a partial worldly manifestation (with limited attributes) of the ultimate reality, the attributeless Brahman. In Visishtadvaita and Dvaita, however, Ishvara (the Supreme Controller) has infinite attributes and is the source of the impersonal Brahman.
- Devas, the expansions of Brahman/God into various forms, each with a certain quality. In the Vedic religion, there were 33 devas.

== History and literature ==
=== Vedic ===
Brahman is a concept present in Vedic Samhitas, the oldest layer of the Vedas dated to the late 2nd millennium BCE. For example,

The Ṛcs are limited (parimita),
The Samans are limited,
And the Yajuses are limited,
But of the Word Brahman, there is no end.

— Taittiriya Samhita VII.3.1.4, Translated by Barbara Holdrege

The concept Brahman is referred to in hundreds of hymns in the Vedic literature. The word Brahma is found in Rig veda hymns such as 2.2.10, 6.21.8, 10.72.2 and in Atharva veda hymns such as 6.122.5, 10.1.12, and 14.1.131. The concept is found in various layers of the Vedic literature; for example: Aitareya Brahmana 1.18.3, Kausitaki Brahmana 6.12, Satapatha Brahmana 13.5.2.5, Taittiriya Brahmana 2.8.8.10, Jaiminiya Brahmana 1.129, Taittiriya Aranyaka 4.4.1 through 5.4.1, Vajasaneyi Samhita 22.4 through 23.25, Maitrayani Samhita 3.12.1:16.2 through 4.9.2:122.15. The concept is extensively discussed in the Upanishads embedded in the Vedas (see next section), and also mentioned in the vedāṅga (the limbs of Vedas) such as the Srauta sutra 1.12.12 and Paraskara Gryhasutra 3.2.10 through 3.4.5.

Jan Gonda states that the diverse reference of Brahman in the Vedic literature, starting with Rigveda Samhitas, convey "different senses or different shades of meaning". There is no one single word in modern Western languages that can render the various shades of meaning of the word Brahman in the Vedic literature, according to Jan Gonda. In verses considered as the most ancient, the Vedic idea of Brahman is the "power immanent in the sound, words, verses and formulas of Vedas". However, states Gonda, the verses suggest that this ancient meaning was never the only meaning, and the concept evolved and expanded in ancient India.

Barbara Holdrege states that the concept Brahman is discussed in the Vedas along four major themes: as the Word or verses (Sabdabrahman), as Knowledge embodied in Creator Principle, as Creation itself, and a Corpus of traditions. Hananya Goodman states that the Vedas conceptualize Brahman as the Cosmic Principles underlying all that exists. Gavin Flood states that the Vedic era witnessed a process of abstraction, where the concept of Brahman evolved and expanded from the power of sound, words and rituals to the "essence of the universe", the "deeper foundation of all phenomena", the "essence of the self (Atman, Self)", and the deeper "truth of a person beyond apparent difference".

=== Upanishads ===
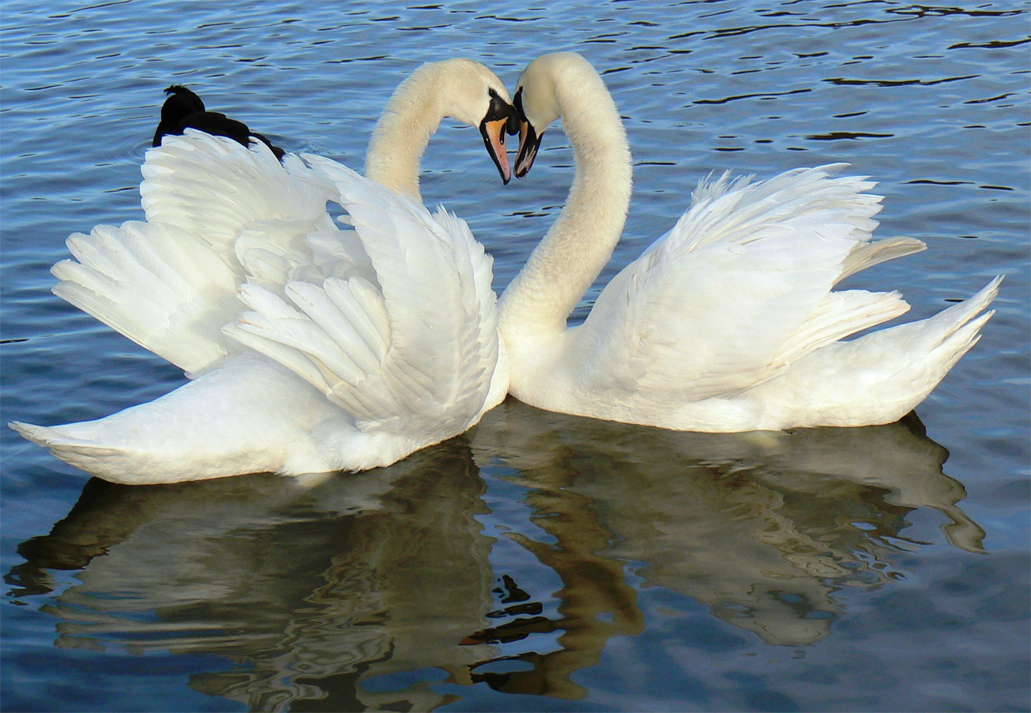
Swan (Hansa, हंस) is the symbol for Brahman-Atman in Hindu iconography.

The central concern of all Upanishads is to discover the relations between ritual, cosmic realities (including gods), and the human body/person. The texts do not present a single unified theory, rather they present a variety of themes with multiple possible interpretations, which flowered in post-Vedic era as premises for the diverse schools of Hinduism.

The concept of Brahman in the Upanishads evolves to encompass metaphysical, ontological, and soteriological themes. Brahman is described as the "primordial reality" that creates, sustains, and ultimately withdraws the universe within itself. It is characterized as the "principle of the world," the "absolute," the "universal" force, the "cosmic principle," and the "ultimate cause" of all existence, including gods. Brahman is also portrayed as the "divine being" or "Lord," which may manifest as either a distinct deity or as an immanent presence within all individuals. It represents the "knowledge" that leads to spiritual liberation, the "Self" that is fearless, luminous, exalted, and blissful, and the "essence" of freedom. Brahman is not only the universe within every living being but also the universe beyond, representing both the internal and external worlds in their entirety. .

Brahman in the Upanishads is also described as the "essence" and "smallest particle of the cosmos," as well as the infinite universe itself. It is the "Self" within every being, the "truth," the "reality," the "absolute," and "bliss" (ananda). While Brahman cannot be directly perceived through the senses, it can be experienced through deep self-realization.

In the words of philosopher Sarvepalli Radhakrishnan, the sages of the Upanishads teach that Brahman is the ultimate essence underlying material phenomena. Though Brahman cannot be seen or heard, its true nature can be comprehended through the cultivation of self-knowledge (atma jnana). This form of knowledge enables one to transcend the illusions of the material world and attain a higher state of consciousness and liberation.

The Upanishads contain several mahā-vākyas or "Great Sayings" on the concept of Brahman:

Text	Upanishad	Translation	Reference
अहं ब्रह्म अस्मि aham brahmāsmi	Brihadaranyaka Upanishad 1.4.10	"I am Brahman"	
अयम् आत्मा ब्रह्म ayam ātmā brahma	Mandukya Upanishad 2	"The Self is Brahman"	
सर्वं खल्विदं ब्रह्म sarvam khalvidam brahma	Chandogya Upanishad 3.14.1	"All this is Brahman"	
एकमेवाद्वितीयम् ekam evadvitiyam	Chandogya Upanishad 6.2.1	"That [Brahman] is one, without a second"	
तत्त्वमसि tat tvam asi	Chandogya Upanishad 6.8.7 et seq.	"That thou art" ("You are Brahman")	
प्रज्ञानं ब्रह्म prajnānam brahma	Aitareya Upanishad 3.3.7	"Wisdom is Brahman"	
नेति नेति Neti Neti	Brihadaranyaka Upanishad 2.3.6	"Not This Not That"	
अंतरात्मा AntarAtman	Katha Upanishad 2.2.12	"Inner Atman"	
उत्तमपुरुषः Uttam Purusha	Chandogya Upanishad 8.12.3	"Supreme Being"	
पूरुषः Purusha	Purusha Sukta	"Supreme Being"	
ब्रह्मणो नाम सत्यमिति Brahmano naam Satyamiti	Chandogya Upanishad 8.3.4	"Brahman is also called Satya "	
प्राणो ब्राह्मणः Prano brahman	Chandogya Upanishad 7.15.1	"Vital Force is Brahman "	

The Upanishad discuss the metaphysical concept of Brahman in many ways, such as the Śāṇḍilya doctrine in Chapter 3 of the Chandogya Upanishad, among of the oldest Upanishadic texts. The Śāṇḍilya doctrine on Brahman is not unique to Chandogya Upanishad, but found in other ancient texts such as the Satapatha Brahmana in section 10.6.3. It asserts that Atman (the inner essence, Self inside man) exists, the Brahman is identical with Atman, that the Brahman is inside man—thematic quotations that are frequently cited by later schools of Hinduism and modern studies on Indian philosophies.

सर्वं खल्विदं ब्रह्म तज्जलानिति शान्त उपासीत। अथ खलु क्रतुमयः पुरुषो यथाक्रतुरस्मिल्लोके पुरुषो भवति तथेतः प्रेत्य भवति स क्रतुं कुर्वीत॥ ||१||

This whole universe is Brahman. In tranquility, let one worship It, as Tajjalan (that from which he came forth, as that into which he will be dissolved, as that in which he breathes).

— Chandogya Upanishad 3.14.1

मनोमयः प्राणशरीरो भारूपः सत्यसंकल्प आकाशात्मा सर्वकर्मा सर्वकामः सर्वगन्धः सर्वरसः सर्वमिदमभ्यत्तोऽवाक्यनादरः॥ ||२|| एष म आत्माऽन्तर्हृदयेऽणीयान्व्रीहेर्वा यवाद्वा सर्षपाद्वा श्यामाकाद्वा श्यामाकतण्डुलाद्वा एष म आत्माऽन्तर्हृदये ज्यायान्पृथिव्या ज्यायानन्तरिक्षाज्ज्यायान्दिवो ज्यायानेभ्यो लोकेभ्यः॥ ||३||

Man is a creature of his Kratumaya (क्रतुमयः, will, purpose). Let him therefore have for himself this will, this purpose: The intelligent, whose body is imbued with life-principle, whose form is light, whose thoughts are driven by truth, whose self is like space (invisible but ever present), from whom all works, all desires, all sensory feelings encompassing this whole world, the silent, the unconcerned, this is me, my Self, my Soul within my heart.

— Chandogya Upanishad 3.14.1 – 3.14.3

सर्वकर्मा सर्वकामः सर्वगन्धः सर्वरसः सर्वमिदमभ्यात्तोऽवाक्यनादर एष म आत्माऽन्तर्हृदय एतद्ब्रह्मैतमितः प्रेत्याभिसंभवितास्मीति यस्य स्यादद्धा न विचिकित्साऽस्तीति ह स्माह शाण्डिल्यः शाण्डिल्यः ॥ ||४||

This is my Soul in the innermost heart, greater than the earth, greater than the aerial space, greater than these worlds. This Soul, this Self of mine is that Brahman.

— Chandogya Upanishad 3.14.3 – 3.14.4

' दिव्यो ह्यमूर्तः पुरुषः सबाह्याभ्यन्तरो ह्यजः । अप्राणो ह्यमनाः शुभ्रो ह्यक्षरात्परतः परः He is bright formless, all pervading, existing within and without, unborn, without prana, without mind, pure and beyond the avyakrita, which is beyond all.

— Mundaka Upanishad 11.1.2

न जायते म्रियते वा विपश्चि- न्नायं कुतश्चिन्न बभूव कश्चित् । अजो नित्यः शाश्वतोऽयं पुराणो न हन्यते हन्यमाने शरीरे Brahman is neither born, neither dies. It has not sprung from anything and nothing springs from it. It is birthless, eternal, ever lasting and ancient, It is not killed when body is killed.

- Katha Upanishad 1.2.18

Paul Deussen notes that teachings similar to above on Brahman, re-appeared centuries later in the words of the 3rd century CE Neoplatonic Roman philosopher Plotinus in Enneades 5.1.2.

== Meaning ==
The concept Brahman has a lot of undertones of meaning and is difficult to understand. It has relevance in metaphysics, ontology, axiology (ethics & aesthetics), teleology and soteriology.

=== Brahman as a metaphysical concept ===
Brahman is the key metaphysical concept in various schools of Hindu philosophy. It is the theme in its diverse discussions to the two central questions of metaphysics: what is ultimately real, and are there principles applying to everything that is real? Brahman is the ultimate "eternally, constant" reality, while the observed universe is a different kind of reality but one which is "temporary, changing" Maya in various orthodox Hindu schools. Maya pre-exists and co-exists with Brahman—the Ultimate Reality, The Highest Universal, the Cosmic Principles.

==== Atman: the ultimate reality ====
In addition to the concept of Brahman, Hindu metaphysics includes the concept of Atman—or Self, which is also considered ultimately real. The various schools of Hinduism, particularly the dual and non-dual schools, differ on the nature of Atman, whether it is distinct from Brahman, or same as Brahman. Those that consider Brahman and Atman as distinct are theistic, and Dvaita Vedanta and later Nyaya schools illustrate this premise. Those that consider Brahman and Atman as same are monist or pantheistic, and Advaita Vedanta, later Samkhya and Yoga schools illustrate this metaphysical premise. In schools that equate Brahman with Atman, Brahman is the sole, ultimate reality. The predominant teaching in the Upanishads is the spiritual identity of Self within each human being, with the Self of every other human being and living being, as well as with the supreme, ultimate reality Brahman.

==== Maya: the perceived reality ====
In the metaphysics of the major schools of Hinduism, Maya is perceived reality, one that does not reveal the hidden principles, the true reality—the Brahman. Maya is unconscious, Brahman-Atman is conscious. Maya is the literal and the effect, Brahman is the figurative Upādāna—the principle and the cause. Maya is born, changes, evolves, dies with time, from circumstances, due to invisible principles of nature. Atman-Brahman is eternal, unchanging, invisible principle, unaffected absolute and resplendent consciousness. Maya, states Archibald Gough, is "the indifferent aggregate of all the possibilities of emanatory or derived existences, pre-existing with Brahman", just like the possibility of a future tree pre-exists in the seed of the tree.

==== Nirguna and Saguna Brahman ====
Brahman, the ultimate reality, is both with and without attributes. In this context, Para Brahman is formless and omniscient Ishvara - the god or Paramatman and Om, where as Saguna Brahman is a manifestation or avatara of god in personified form.

द्वे वाव ब्रह्मणो रूपे—मूर्तं चैवामूर्तं च, मर्त्यं चामृतं च, स्थितं च यच्च, सच्च, त्यच्च

Brahman has but two forms—gross and subtle, mortal and immortal, limited and unlimited, defined and undefined.

— - Brihadaranyaka Upanishad 2.3.1

While the Advaita Vedanta sub-school emphasizes the complete equivalence of Brahman and Atman, it also expounds on Brahman as saguna Brahman—the Brahman with attributes, and nirguna Brahman—the Brahman without attributes. The nirguna Brahman is the Brahman as it really is, however, the saguna Brahman is posited as a means to realizing nirguna Brahman, but the Hinduism schools declare saguna Brahman to be a part of the ultimate nirguna Brahman. The concept of the saguna Brahman, such as in the form of avatars, is considered in these schools of Hinduism to be a useful symbolism, path and tool for those who are still on their spiritual journey, but the concept is finally cast aside by the fully enlightened.

=== Brahman as an ontological concept ===
Brahman, along with Self (Atman) are part of the ontological premises of Indian philosophy. Different schools of Indian philosophy have held widely dissimilar ontologies. Buddhism and Charvaka school of Hinduism deny that there exists anything called "a Self" (individual Atman or Brahman in the cosmic sense), while the orthodox schools of Hinduism, Jainism and Ajivikas hold that there exists "a Self".

Brahman as well the Atman in every human being (and living being) is considered equivalent and the sole reality, the eternal, self-born, unlimited, innately free, blissful Absolute in schools of Hinduism such as the Advaita Vedanta and Yoga. Knowing one's own self is knowing the God inside oneself, and this is held as the path to knowing the ontological nature of Brahman (universal Self) as it is identical to the Atman (individual Self). The nature of Atman-Brahman is held in these schools, states Barbara Holdrege, to be as a pure being (sat), consciousness (cit) and full of bliss (ananda), and it is formless, distinctionless, nonchanging and unbounded.

In theistic schools, in contrast, such as Dvaita Vedanta, the nature of Brahman is held as eternal, unlimited, innately free, blissful Absolute, while each individual's Self is held as distinct and limited which can at best come close in eternal blissful love of the Brahman (therein viewed as the Godhead).

Other schools of Hinduism have their own ontological premises relating to Brahman, reality and nature of existence. Vaisheshika school of Hinduism, for example, holds a substantial, realist ontology. The Charvaka school denied Brahman and Atman, and held a materialist ontology.

=== Brahman as an axiological concept ===
Brahman and Atman are key concepts to Hindu theories of axiology: ethics and aesthetics. Ananda (bliss), state Michael Myers and other scholars, has axiological importance to the concept of Brahman, as the universal inner harmony. Some scholars equate Brahman with the highest value, in an axiological sense.

The axiological concepts of Brahman and Atman is central to Hindu theory of values. A statement such as 'I am Brahman', states Shaw, means 'I am related to everything', and this is the underlying premise for compassion for others in Hinduism, for each individual's welfare, peace, or happiness depends on others, including other beings and nature at large, and vice versa. Tietge states that even in non-dual schools of Hinduism where Brahman and Atman are treated ontologically equivalent, the theory of values emphasizes individual agent and ethics. In these schools of Hinduism, states Tietge, the theory of action is derived from and centered in compassion for the other, and not egotistical concern for the self.

The axiological theory of values emerges implicitly from the concepts of Brahman and Atman, states Bauer. The aesthetics of human experience and ethics are one consequence of self-knowledge in Hinduism, one resulting from the perfect, timeless unification of one's Self with the Brahman, the Self of everyone, everything and all eternity, wherein the pinnacle of human experience is not dependent on an afterlife, but pure consciousness in the present life itself. It does not assume that an individual is weak nor does it presume that he is inherently evil, but the opposite: human Self and its nature is held as fundamentally unqualified, faultless, beautiful, blissful, ethical, compassionate and good. Ignorance is to assume it evil, liberation is to know its eternal, expansive, pristine, happy and good nature. The axiological premises in the Hindu thought and Indian philosophies in general, states Nikam, is to elevate the individual, exalting the innate potential of man, where the reality of his being is the objective reality of the universe. The Upanishads of Hinduism, summarizes Nikam, hold that the individual has the same essence and reality as the objective universe, and this essence is the finest essence; the individual Self is the universal Self, and Atman is the same reality and the same aesthetics as the Brahman.

=== Brahman as a teleological concept ===
Brahman and Atman are very important teleological concepts. Teleology deals with the apparent purpose, principle, or goal of something. In the first chapter of the Shvetashvatara Upanishad, these questions are addressed. It says:

किं कारणं ब्रह्म कुतः स्म जाता जीवाम केन क्व च संप्रतिष्ठाः।

अधिष्ठिताः केन सुखेतरेषु वर्तामहे ब्रह्मविदो व्यवस्थाम्‌॥ ||१||

"People who make inquiries about brahman say:
What is the cause of Brahman? Why were we born? By what do we live? On what are we established? Governed by whom, O you who know Brahman, do we live in pleasure and in pain, each in our respective situation?

— Shvetashvatara Upanishad, Hymns 1.1

According to the Upanishads, the main purpose/meaning of anything or everything can be explained or achieved/understood only through the realization of the Brahman. The apparent purpose of everything can be grasped by obtaining the Brahman, as the Brahman is referred to that when known, all things become known.

कस्मिन् नु भगवो विज्ञाते सर्वमिदं विज्ञातं भवतीति ॥३॥

तस्मै स होवाच - - द्वे विद्ये वेदितव्ये इति ह स्म यद् ब्रह्मविदो वदन्ति परा चैवापरा च ॥ ४॥

"What is that my lord, by which being known, all of this becomes known?"
Angiras told him, "Two types of knowledge a man should learn, those who know Brahman tell us — the higher and the lower. The lower of the two consists of the Rgveda, Yajurveda, Samaveda (...), whereas, the higher is that by which one grasps the imperishable (Brahman)."

— Mundaka Upanishad, Hymns 1.1

Elsewhere in the Upanishads, the relationship between Brahman and all knowledge is established, such that any questions of apparent purpose/teleology are resolved when the Brahman is ultimately known. This is found in the Aitareya Upanishad 3.3 and Brihadaranyaka Upanishad 4.4.17.

Knowledge is the eye of all that, and on knowledge it is founded. Knowledge is the eye of the world, and knowledge, the foundation. Brahman is knowing.

— Aitereya Upanishad, Hymns 3.3

One of the main reasons why Brahman should be realized is because it removes suffering from a person's life. Following on Advaita Vedanta tradition, this is because the person has the ability and knowledge to discriminate between the unchanging (Purusha; Atman-Brahman) and the ever-changing (Prakriti; maya) and so the person is not attached to the transient, fleeting and impermanent. Hence, the person is only content with their true self and not the body or anything else. Further elaborations of Brahman as the central teleological issue are found in Shankara's commentaries of the Brahma Sutras and his Vivekachudamani.

In Brihadaranyaka Upanishad 3.9.26 it mentions that the atman 'neither trembles in fear nor suffers injury' and the Isha Upanishad 6-7 too talks about suffering as non-existent when one becomes the Brahman as they see the self in all beings and all beings in the self. The famous Advaita Vedanta commentator Shankara noted that Sabda Pramana (scriptural epistemology) & anubhava (personal experience) is the ultimate & only source of knowing/learning the Brahman, and that its purpose or existence cannot be verified independently because it is not an object of perception/inference (unless one is spiritually advanced, thereby it's truth becomes self-evident/intuitive) & is beyond conceptualizations. But he does note the Upanishads themselves are ultimately derived from use of the various pramanas to derive at ultimate truths (as seen in Yalnavalkya's philosophical inquires). All Vedanta schools agree on this. These teleological discussions inspired some refutations from competing philosophies about the origin/purpose of Brahman & avidya (ignorance) and the relationship between the two, leading to variant schools like Kashmiri Shaivism & others.

=== Brahman as a soteriological concept: Moksha ===
The orthodox schools of Hinduism, particularly Vedanta, Samkhya and Yoga schools, focus on the concept of Brahman and Atman in their discussion of moksha. The Advaita Vedanta holds there is no being/non-being distinction between Atman and Brahman. The knowledge of Atman (Self-knowledge) is synonymous to the knowledge of Brahman inside the person and outside the person. Furthermore, the knowledge of Brahman leads to a sense of oneness with all existence, self-realization, indescribable joy, and moksha (freedom, bliss), because Brahman-Atman is the origin and end of all things, the universal principle behind and at source of everything that exists, consciousness that pervades everything and everyone.

The theistic sub-school such as Dvaita Vedanta of Hinduism, starts with the same premises, but adds the premise that individual Self and Brahman are distinct, and thereby reaches entirely different conclusions where Brahman is conceptualized in a manner similar to God in other major world religions. The theistic schools assert that moksha is the loving, eternal union or nearness of one's Self with the distinct and separate Brahman (Vishnu, Shiva or equivalent henotheism). Brahman in these sub-schools of Hinduism is considered the highest perfection of existence, which every Self journeys towards in its own way for moksha.

== Hindu schools of thought ==
=== Vedanta ===
The concept of Brahman, its nature and its relationship with Atman and the observed universe, is a major point of difference between the various sub-schools of the Vedanta school of Hinduism.

==== Advaita Vedanta ====
Advaita Vedanta espouses nondualism. Brahman is the sole unchanging reality, there is no duality, no limited individual Self nor a separate unlimited cosmic Self, rather all Self, all of existence, across all space and time, is one and the same. The universe and the Self inside each being is Brahman, and the universe and the Self outside each being is Brahman. Brahman is the origin and end of all things, material and spiritual. Brahman is the root source of everything that exists. He states that Brahman can neither be taught nor perceived (as an object of intellectual knowledge), but it can be learned and realized by all human beings. The goal of Advaita Vedanta is to realize that one's Self (Atman) gets obscured by ignorance and false-identification ("Avidya"). When Avidya is removed, the Atman (Self inside a person) is realized as identical with Brahman. The Brahman is not an outside, separate, dual entity, the Brahman is within each person, states Advaita Vedanta school of Hinduism. Brahman is all that is eternal, unchanging and that which truly exists. This view is stated in this school in many different forms, such as "Ekam sat" ("Truth is one"), and all is Brahman.

The universe does not simply come from Brahman, it is Brahman. According to Adi Shankara, a proponent of Advaita Vedanta, the knowledge of Brahman that shruti provides cannot be obtained by any other means besides self inquiry.

In Advaita Vedanta, nirguna Brahman is held to be the ultimate and sole reality. Consciousness is not a property of Brahman but rather its very nature. In this respect, Advaita Vedanta differs from other Vedanta schools.

Example verses from Bhagavad-Gita include:

The offering is Brahman; the oblation is Brahman;
offered by Brahman into the fire of Brahman.
Brahman will be attained by him,
who always sees Brahman in action. – Hymn 4.24

He who finds his happiness within,
His delight within,
And his light within,
This yogin attains the bliss of Brahman, becoming Brahman. – Hymn 5.24

— Bhagavad Gita

==== Dvaita Vedanta ====
Brahman of Dvaita Vedanta is a concept similar to God in major world religions. Dvaita holds that the individual Self is dependent on God, but distinct. Dvaita philosophy argues against the concept of a shared existence between Brahman and finite beings. It sees any concept of shared existence or non-dualism (Advaita) as incompatible with the nature of Brahman's transcendent perfection. Madhva places importance on the unique individuality of each entity (vishesha).

Dvaita propounds Tattvavada which means understanding differences between Tattvas (entities) within the universal substrate as follows:

1. Jîva-Îshvara-bheda — difference between the Self and the Supreme God
2. Jada-Îshvara-bheda — difference between the insentient and the Supreme God
3. Mitha-jîva-bheda — difference between any two Selves
4. Jada-jîva-bheda — difference between insentient and the Self
5. Mitha-jada-bheda — difference between any two insentients

==== Vishishtadvaita ====
In Vishishtadvaita, Ramanuja asserts that Brahman is God, and that this God is Narayana. In his commentary on the Brahma Sutras 1.1.1, Ramanuja defines Brahman as the "'highest person,' one who by his own nature is free from all imperfections and in possession of host of innumerable auspicious qualities of unsurpassable excellence." Using this definition, Ramanuja argues that Brahman must be God because Brahman's qualities are unsurpassably superior to all, and thus "only the Lord of all can thus be denoted, and 'Brahman' primarily denotes him alone". Ramanuja asserts that the relationship between God and the individual selves must be one of devotion, and moksha or liberation is said by him to be caused by the selves' worship of Brahman: "The cessation of bondage...is to be obtained only through the grace of the highest Person who is pleased by worshipper's meditation, which is devotion".

==== Achintya Bheda Abheda ====
The Acintya Bheda Abheda philosophy is similar to Dvaitadvaita. In this philosophy, Brahman is not just impersonal, but also personal. That Brahman is Supreme Personality of Godhead, though on first stage of realization (by process called jnana) of Absolute Truth, He is realized as impersonal Brahman, then as personal Brahman having eternal Vaikuntha abode (also known as Brahmalokah sanatana), then as Paramatma (by process of yoga–meditation on Supreme self, Vishnu-God in heart)—Vishnu (Narayana, also in everyone's heart) who has many abodes known as Vishnu lokas (Vaikuntha), and finally (Absolute Truth is realized by bhakti) as Bhagavan, Supreme Personality of Godhead, who is source of both Paramatma and Brahman (personal, impersonal, or both).

=== Bhakti movement ===
The Bhakti movement of Hinduism built its theosophy around two concepts of Brahman—Nirguna and Saguna. Nirguna Brahman was the concept of the Ultimate Reality as formless, without attributes or quality. Saguna Brahman, in contrast, was envisioned and developed as with form, attributes and quality. The two had parallels in the ancient pantheistic unmanifest and theistic manifest traditions, respectively, and traceable to Arjuna-Krishna dialogue in the Bhagavad Gita. It is the same Brahman, but viewed from two perspectives, one from Nirguni knowledge-focus and other from Saguni love-focus, united as Krishna (an 8th incarnation of Lord Vishnu) in the Gita. Nirguna bhakta's poetry were Jnana-shrayi, or had roots in knowledge. Saguna bhakta's poetry were Prema-shrayi, or with roots in love. In Bhakti, the emphasis is reciprocal love and devotion, where the devotee loves God, and God loves the devotee.

Jeaneane Fowler states that the concepts of Nirguna and Saguna Brahman, at the root of Bhakti movement theosophy, underwent more profound development with the ideas of Vedanta school of Hinduism, particularly those of Adi Shankara's Advaita Vedanta, Ramanuja's Vishishtadvaita Vedanta, and Madhvacharya's Dvaita Vedanta. Two 12th-century influential treatises on bhakti were Sandilya Bhakti Sutra—a treatise resonating with Nirguna-bhakti, and Narada Bhakti Sutra—a treatise that leans towards Saguna-bhakti.

Nirguna and Saguna Brahman concepts of the Bhakti movement has been a baffling one to scholars, particularly the Nirguni tradition because it offers, states David Lorenzen, "heart-felt devotion to a God without attributes, without even any definable personality". Yet given the "mountains of Nirguni bhakti literature", adds Lorenzen, bhakti for Nirguna Brahman has been a part of the reality of the Hindu tradition along with the bhakti for Saguna Brahman. These were two alternate ways of imagining God during the bhakti movement.

== Buddhist understanding of Brahman ==
Buddhism rejects the Upanishadic doctrine of Brahman and Atman (permanent Self, essence). (Note: Merv Fowler, Zen Buddhism: Beliefs and Practices (Brighton: Sussex Academic, 2005), p. 30: "Upanisadic thought is anything but consistent; nevertheless, there is a common focus on the acceptance of a totally transcendent Absolute, a trend which arose in the Vedic period. This indescribable Absolute is called Brahman [...] The true Self and Brahman are one and the same. Known as the Brahman-Atman synthesis, this theory, which is central to Upanisadic thought, is the cornerstone of Indian philosophy. The Brahman-Atman synthesis, which posits the theory of a permanent, unchanging self, was anathema to Buddhists, and it was as a reaction to the synthesis that Buddhism first drew breath. Merv Fowler p. 47: "For the Upanisadic sages, the real is the Self, is Atman, is Brahman. [...] To the Buddhist, however, any talk of an Atman or permanent, unchanging Self, the very kernel of Upanisadic thought, is anathema, a false notion of manifest proportion.") According to Damien Keown, "the Buddha said he could find no evidence for the existence of either the personal Self (atman) or its cosmic counterpart (brahman)". The metaphysics of Buddhism rejects Brahman (ultimate being), Brahman-like essence, Self and anything metaphysically equivalent through its Anatta doctrine, but their belief of Trikaya is very similar to the sat-cit-ananda characteristics of Brahman.

According to Merv Fowler, some forms of Buddhism have incorporated concepts that resemble that of Brahman. (Note: Merv Fowler, Buddhism: Beliefs and Practices (Brighton: Sussex Academic, 1999), p. 34: "It was inevitable that the non-theistic philosophy of orthodox Buddhism should court the older Hindu practices and, in particular, infuse into its philosophy the belief in a totally transcendent Absolute of the nature of Brahman.") As an example, Fowler cites the early Sarvastivada school of Buddhism, which "had come to accept a very pantheistic religious philosophy, and are important because of the impetus they gave to the development of Mahayana Buddhism". According to William Theodore De Bary, in the doctrines of the Yogacara school of Mahayana Buddhism, "the Body of Essence, the Ultimate Buddha, who pervaded and underlay the whole universe [...] was in fact the World Self, the Brahman of the Upanishads, in a new form". According to Fowler, some scholars have identified the Buddhist nirvana, conceived of as the Ultimate Reality, with the Hindu Brahman/atman; Fowler claims that this view "has gained little support in Buddhist circles." Fowler asserts that the authors of a number of Mahayana texts took pains to differentiate their ideas from the Upanishadic doctrine of Brahman. (Note: Merv Fowler, Buddhism: Beliefs and Practices (Brighton: Sussex Academic, 1999), p. 82: "The original writers of these Mahayana texts were not at all pleased that their writings were seen to contain the Brahman of the Upanisads in a new form. The authors of the Lankavatara strenuously denied that the womb of Tathagatahood, [...] was in any way equatable with the 'eternal self', the Brahmanical atman of Upanisadic thought. Similarly, the claim in the Nirvana Sutra that the Buddha regarded Buddhahood as a 'great atman' caused the Yogacarins considerable distress.")

=== Brahma as a surrogate for Brahman in Buddhist texts ===
The spiritual concept of Brahman is far older in the Vedic literature, and some scholars suggest deity Brahma may have emerged as a personal conception and icon with form and attributes (saguna version) of the impersonal, nirguna (without attributes), formless universal principle called Brahman. In the Hindu texts, one of the earliest mentions of deity Brahma along with Vishnu and Shiva is in the fifth Prapathaka (lesson) of the Maitrayaniya Upanishad, probably composed in late 1st millennium BCE, after the rise of Buddhism.

The early Buddhists attacked the concept of Brahma, states Gananath Obeyesekere, and thereby polemically attacked the Vedic and Upanishadic concept of gender neutral, abstract metaphysical Brahman. This critique of Brahma in early Buddhist texts aims at ridiculing the Vedas, but the same texts simultaneously call metta (loving-kindness, compassion) as the state of union with Brahma. The early Buddhist approach to Brahma was to reject any creator aspect, while retaining the value system in the Vedic Brahmavihara concepts, in the Buddhist value system. According to Martin Wiltshire, the term "Brahma loka" in the Buddhist canon, instead of "Svarga loka", is likely a Buddhist attempt to choose and emphasize the "truth power" and knowledge focus of the Brahman concept in the Upanishads. Simultaneously, by reformulating Brahman as Brahma and relegating it within its Devas and Samsara theories, early Buddhism rejected the Atman-Brahman premise of the Vedas to present its own Dhamma doctrines (anicca, dukkha and anatta).

== Brahman in Chinese thought ==
L. S. Vasil’ev, writing for the University of Pennsylvania, argued that syncretic Taoists used Brahman in their worship as a substitute for Tao.

Victor H. Mair thought that Taoists in the early history of the faith had positive "cultural relations" with Hindu groups and that the Tao Te Ching was written in reaction to Indian philosophy and that the author(s) viewed Brahman as being the same as Tao.

== Brahman in Sikhism ==
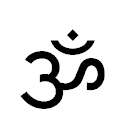
Ik Onkar (left) is part of the Mul Mantar in Sikhism, where it means "Onkar [God, Reality] is one". The Onkar of Sikhism is related to Om—also called Omkāra—in Hinduism. The ancient texts of Hinduism state Om to be a symbolism for the highest reality, Brahman.

The metaphysical concept of Brahman, particularly as nirguni Brahman—attributeless, formless, eternal Highest Reality—is at the foundation of Sikhism. This belief is observed through nirguni Bhakti by the Sikhs.

In Gauri, which is part of the Guru Granth Sahib, Brahman is declared as "One without a second", in Sri Rag "everything is born of Him, and is finally absorbed in Him", in Var Asa "whatever we see or hear is the manifestation of Brahman". Nesbitt states that the first two words, Ik Onkar, in the twelve-word Mul Mantar at the opening of the Sikh scripture Guru Granth Sahib, has been translated in three different ways by scholars: "There is one god", "This being is one", and as "One reality is".

Similar emphasis on "One without a second" for metaphysical concept of Brahman, is found in ancient texts of Hinduism, such as the Chandogya Upanishad's chapter 6.2. The ideas about God and Highest Reality in Sikhism share themes found in the Saguna and Nirguna concepts of Brahman in Hinduism.

The concept of Ultimate Reality (Brahman) is also referred in Sikhism as Nam, Sat-naam or Naam, and Ik Oankar like Hindu Om symbolizes this Reality.

== Brahman in Jainism ==
Scholars contest whether the concept of Brahman is rejected or accepted in Jainism. The concept of a theistic God is rejected by Jainism, but Jiva or "Atman (Self) exists" is held to be a metaphysical truth and central to its theory of rebirths and Kevala Jnana.

Bissett states that Jainism accepts the "material world" and "Atman", but rejects Brahman—the metaphysical concept of Ultimate Reality and Cosmic Principles found in the ancient texts of Hinduism. Goswami, in contrast, states that the literature of Jainism has an undercurrent of monist theme, where the self who gains the knowledge of Brahman (Highest Reality, Supreme Knowledge) is identical to Brahman itself. Jaini states that Jainism neither accepts nor rejects the premise of Ultimate Reality (Brahman), instead Jain ontology adopts a many sided doctrine called Anekantavada. This doctrine holds that "reality is irreducibly complex" and no human view or description can represent the Absolute Truth. Those who have understood and realized the Absolute Truth are the liberated ones and the Supreme Self (Paramatman), with Kevala Jnana.

== Comparison of Brahma, Brahman, Brahmin and Brahmanas ==
Brahma is distinct from Brahman. Brahma is a male deity, in the post-Vedic Puranic literature, who creates but neither preserves nor destroys anything. He is envisioned in some Hindu texts to have emerged from the metaphysical Brahman along with Vishnu (preserver), Shiva (destroyer), all other gods, goddesses, matter and other beings.

Brahman is a metaphysical concept of Hinduism referring to the ultimate unchanging reality, that is uncreated, eternal, infinite, transcendent, the cause, the foundation, the source and the goal of all existence. It is envisioned as either the cause or that which transforms itself into everything that exists in the universe as well as all beings, that which existed before the present universe and time, which exists as current universe and time, and that which will absorb and exist after the present universe and time ends. It is a gender neutral abstract concept. The abstract Brahman concept is predominant in the Vedic texts, particularly the Upanishads; while the deity Brahma finds minor mention in the Vedas and the Upanishads. In the Puranic and the Epics literature, the deity Brahma appears more often, but inconsistently.

Some texts suggest that the god Vishnu created Brahma (Vaishnavism), others suggest god Shiva created Brahma (Shaivism), yet others suggest goddess Devi created Brahma (Shaktism), and these texts then go on to state that Brahma is a secondary creator of the world working respectively on their behalf. A similarity between Brahma and Brahman is that Brahman is said to be an anchor for the world and the relations between all things, including opposites, in it, whereas Brahma is a creator god who aids the world in many Hindu and Buddhist traditions.

Further, the medieval era texts of these major theistic traditions of Hinduism assert that the saguna (Note: representation with face and attributes.) Brahman is Vishnu, is Shiva, or is Devi respectively, they are different names or aspects of the Brahman, and that the Atman (Self) within every living being is the same or part of this ultimate, eternal Brahman.

Brahmin is a varna in Hinduism specialising in theory as priests, preservers and transmitters of sacred literature across generations.

The Brahmanas are one of the four ancient layers of texts within the Vedas. They are primarily a digest incorporating myths, legends, the explanation of Vedic rituals and in some cases philosophy. They are embedded within each of the four Vedas, and form a part of the Hindu śruti literature.

== See also ==
- Atman (Hinduism)
- Arche
- Asha
- Consciousness
- Logos
- Paramatman
- Parabrahman
- Prakṛti
- Purusha
- Shentong
- Tao
- Teotl

== Sources ==
- Fowler, Jeaneane D. (2002). Perspectives of Reality: An Introduction to the Philosophy of Hinduism. Sussex Academic Press. ISBN 978-1-898723-93-6.
- Klostermaier, Klaus K. (2010). "Chapter 12". A Survey of Hinduism: Third Edition. State University of New York Press. ISBN 978-0-7914-8011-3.
- Michaels, Axel (2004). Hinduism. Past and present. Princeton, New Jersey: Princeton University Press.
- Olivelle, Patrick (1998). The Early Upanisads. Oxford University Press. ISBN 978-0195124354.
- Olivelle, Patrick (2008). Upanisads. Oxford World Classics.
- Potter, Karl H. (2008), The Encyclopedia of Indian Philosophies: Advaita Vedānta Up to Śaṃkara and His Pupils, Delhi: Motilal Banarsidass Publishers Private Limited
- Puligandla, Ramakrishna (1997), Fundamentals of Indian Philosophy, New Delhi: D. K. Printworld (P) Ltd.
- Raju, P. T. (1992), The Philosophical Traditions of India, Delhi: Motilal Banarsidass Publishers Private Limited
- Sinari, Ramakant (2000), Advaita and Contemporary Indian Philosophy. In: Chattopadhyana (gen.ed.), "History of Science, Philosophy and Culture in Indian Civilization. Volume II Part 2: Advaita Vedanta", Delhi: Centre for Studies in Civilizations
- Toropov, Brandon; Buckles, Luke (2011), Guide to World Religions, Penguin
