= Chandogya Upanishad =

One of the ancient Sanskrit holy scriptures of Hinduism

Chandogya
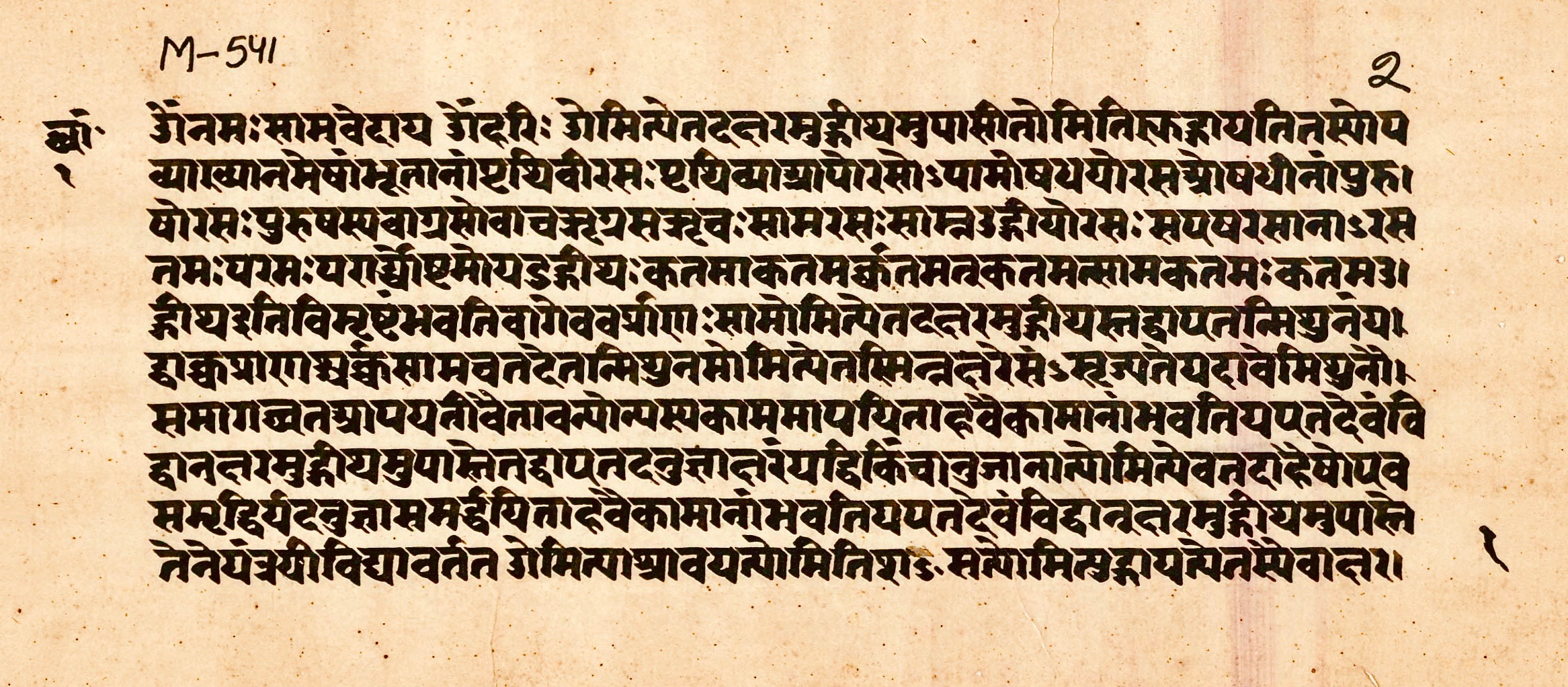
- The Chandogya Upanishad verses 1.1.1-1.1.9 (Sanskrit, Devanagari script)
- Devanagari: छान्दोग्य
- IAST: Chāndogya
- Date: 8th to 6th century BCE
- Type: Mukhya Upanishad
- Linked Veda: Samaveda
- Chapters: Eight
- Philosophy: Oneness of the Atman
- Commented by: Adi Shankara, Madhvacharya, Rangaramanuja
- Popular verse: Tat tvam asi

The Chandogya Upanishad (Sanskrit: छान्दोग्योपनिषद्, IAST: Chāndogyopaniṣad) is a Sanskrit text embedded in the Chandogya Brahmana of the Samaveda of Hinduism. In the Muktika canon of 108 Upanishads, it is listed as the ninth.

The Upanishad belongs to the Tandya school of the Samaveda. Like Brihadaranyaka Upanishad, the Chandogya Upanishad is an anthology of texts that must have pre-existed as separate texts, and were edited into a larger text by one or more ancient Indian scholars. The precise chronology of the Chandogya Upanishad is uncertain, and it is generally dated to have been composed between the 8th and 6th centuries BCE in India.

As one of the most extensive Upanishadic compilations, it comprises eight Prapāthakas (literally 'lectures' or 'chapters'), each divided into multiple sections containing numerous verses. The volumes include a diverse array of stories and themes. As part of the poetic and chants-focused Samaveda, the broad unifying theme of the Upanishad is the importance of speech, language, songs, and chants in the pursuit of knowledge and salvation, to metaphysical premises and questions, as well as to rituals.

The Chandogya Upanishad is one of the most cited texts in later Bhasyas (reviews and commentaries) by scholars from the diverse schools of Hinduism, with verses 8-16 of the sixth chapter containing the famous dictum Tat Tvam Asi, "that('s how) you are." According to Deutsch and Dalvi, "the entire sixth chapter is no doubt the most influential of the entire corpus of the Upanishads."

== Etymology ==
The name of the Upanishad is derived from the word Chanda or chandas, which means "poetic meter, prosody". A chandoga is "one who sings in verse", i.e., one who chants from the Samaveda. The nature of the text relates to the patterns of structure, stress, rhythm and intonation in language, songs and chants. The text is sometimes known as Chandogyopanishad.

== Chronology ==
The Chandogya Upanishad was in all likelihood composed in the earlier part of 1st millennium BCE, and is one of the oldest Upanishads. The exact century of the Upanishad composition is unknown, uncertain and contested.

The chronology of the early Upanishads is difficult to resolve due to scant evidence, an analysis of archaism, style, and repetitions across texts, driven by assumptions about likely evolution of ideas, and on presumptions about which philosophy might have influenced which other Indian philosophies. Patrick Olivelle states, "in spite of claims made by some, in reality, any dating of these documents (early Upanishads) that attempts a precision closer than a few centuries is as stable as a house of cards".

The chronology and authorship of the Chandogya Upanishad, along with the Brihadaranyaka and Kaushitaki Upanishads, is further complicated because they are compiled anthologies of literature that must have existed as independent texts before they became part of these Upanishads.

Scholars have offered different estimates ranging from 800 BCE to 600 BCE, all preceding Buddhism. According to a 1998 review by Patrick Olivelle, the Chandogya was composed by the 7th or 6th century BCE, give or take a century or so. Stephen Phillips states that the Chandogya was completed after Brihadaranyaka, both probably in early part of the 8th century BCE.

== Structure ==
The text has eight Prapāthakas (प्रपाठक, lectures, chapters), each with varying number of Khandas (खण्ड, volume).

Each Khanda has varying number of verses. The first chapter includes 13 volumes each with a varying number of verses, the second chapter has 24 volumes, the third chapter contains 19 volumes, the fourth is composed of 17 volumes, the fifth has 24 volumes, the sixth chapter has 16 volumes, the seventh includes 26 volumes, and the eight chapter is the last with 15 volumes.

The Upanishad comprises the last eight chapters of the ten-chapter Chandogya Brahmana text. The first chapter of the Brahmana is short and concerns ritual-related hymns to celebrate a marriage ceremony and the birth of a child. The second chapter of the Brahmana is also short, and its mantras are addressed to divine beings at life rituals. The last eight chapters are long, and are called the Chandogya Upanishad.

A notable structural feature of the Chandogya Upanishad is that it contains many nearly identical passages and stories also found in Brihadaranyaka Upanishad, but in a precise meter.

The Chandogya Upanishad, like other Upanishads, was a living document. Every chapter shows evidence of insertion or interpolation at a later age, because the structure, meter, grammar, style and content are inconsistent with what precedes or follows the suspect content and section. Additionally, supplements were likely attached to various volumes in a different age.

Klaus Witz structurally divides the Chandogya Upanishad into three natural groups. The first group comprises chapters I and II, which largely deal with the structure, stress and rhythmic aspects of language and its expression (speech), particularly with the syllable Om (ॐ, Aum). The second group consists of chapters III-V, with a collection of more than 20 Upasanas and Vidyas on premises about the universe, life, mind and spirituality. The third group consists of chapters VI-VIII that deal with metaphysical questions such as the nature of reality and Self.

== Content ==
=== First Prapāṭhaka ===
==== The chant of Om, the essence of all ====
The Chandogya Upanishad opens with the recommendation that "let a man meditate on Om". It calls the syllable Om the udgitha (उद्गीथ, song, chant), and asserts that the significance of the syllable is this: the essence of all beings is earth, the essence of earth is water, the essence of water are the plants, the essence of plants is man, the essence of man is speech, the essence of speech is the Rig Veda, the essence of the Rig Veda is the Samaveda, and the essence of Samaveda is udgitha.

Rik (ऋच्, Ṛc) is speech, states the text, and Sāman (सामन्) is breath; they are pairs, and because they have love and desire for each other, speech and breath find themselves together and mate to produce song. The highest song is Om, asserts volume 1.1 of the Chandogya Upanishad. It is the symbol of awe, reverence, and threefold knowledge because Adhvaryu invokes it, the Hotr recites it, and Udgatr sings it.

In section 1.4, the text highlights the importance of Om in the High Chant.

==== Good and evil may be everywhere, yet life-principle is inherently good ====
Om symbol

The significance of Om syllable is discussed in the Chandogya Upanishad, as well as other principal Upanishads. Chandogya's exposition of syllable Om in its first chapter combines etymological speculations, symbolism, metric structure and philosophical themes.

The second volume of the first chapter continues its discussion of the syllable Om, explaining its use as a struggle between Devas (gods) and Asuras (demons) – both being races derived from the same Prajapati (creator of life). Max Muller states that this struggle between gods and demons is considered allegorical by ancient scholars, representing good and evil inclinations within humans, respectively. In this allegory, Prajapati represents humanity in general. The struggle is explained as a legend, that is also found in a more complete and likely original ancient version in the Brihadaranyaka Upanishad (chapter 1.3).

The legend in section 1.2 of the Chandogya Upanishad states that the gods took the Udgitha (song of Om) unto themselves, thinking, "with this [song] we shall overcome the demons". The gods revered the Udgitha as the sense of smell (the nose), but the demons cursed it and ever since, one smells both good-smelling and bad-smelling things, because the sense of smell is afflicted with good and evil. The deities thereafter revered the Udgitha as speech, but the demons afflicted it and ever since one speaks both truth and untruth, because speech has been struck with good and evil. The deities next revered the Udgitha as the sense of sight (the eye), but the demons struck it and ever since one sees both what is harmonious, sightly and what is chaotic, unsightly, because sight is afflicted with good and evil. The gods then revered the Udgitha as the sense of hearing (the ear), but the demons afflicted it and ever since one hears both what is worth hearing and what is not worth hearing, because hearing is afflicted with good and evil. The gods thereafter revered the Udgitha as Manas (the mind), but the demons afflicted it and therefore one imagines both what is worth imagining and what is not worth imagining, because the mind is afflicted with good and evil. Then the gods revered the Udgitha as Prāṇa (vital breath, breath in the mouth, life-principle), and the demons struck it but they fell into pieces. Life-principle is free from evil, it is inherently good. The gods inside humans – the bodily organs and senses are great, but they all revere the life-principle because it is the essence and the lord of all of them. Om is the Udgitha, the symbol of life-principle in humans.

==== Space: the origin and the end of everything ====
The Chandogya Upanishad, in the eighth and ninth volumes of the first chapter, describes the discussion between three men proficient in Udgitha, about the origins and support of Udgitha and all of empirical existence. The discussion is translated by Max Muller and Paul Deussen as,

What is the origin of this world?
Space, said he. Verily, all things here arise out of space. They disappear back into space, for space alone is greater than these, space is the final goal. This is the most excellent Udgitha [Om, ॐ]. This is endless. The most excellent is his, the most excellent worlds does he win, who, knowing it thus, reveres the most excellent Udgitha.

— Chandogya Upanishad 1.9.1-1.9.2

Max Muller notes that the term "space" in this passage is interpreted in Vedanta Sutra verse 1.1.22 as a symbolism for the Vedic concept of Brahman. Paul Deussen explains that the term Brahman means the "creative principle which lies realized in the whole world".

==== A ridicule and satire on egotistic nature of priests ====
The tenth through twelfth volumes of the first "Prapāthaka" of the Chandogya Upanishad describe a legend about priests and criticize their recitation of the verses and singing of hymns without understanding their meaning or the divine principle they represent. The twelfth volume in particular ridicules the self-serving aims of priests through a satire that is often referred to as "the Udgitha of the dogs".

Verses 1.12.1 through 1.12.5 describe a convoy of dogs who appear before Vaka Dalbhya (literally, sage who murmurs and hums), who was busy in a quiet place repeating the Veda. The dogs ask, "Sir, sing and get us food, we are hungry". The Vedic reciter watches in silence, then the head dog says to other dogs, "come back tomorrow". The next day, the dogs return, each dog holding the tail of the preceding dog in his mouth, just like priests hold the gown of preceding priest when they walk in procession. In Max Muller's translation, the next the passage reads "After they [dogs] had settled down, they began to say Hiṅ [a ritual syllable representing Prajapati]. "Om, let us eat! Om, let us drink! [...] Lord of food, bring hither food, bring it!, Om!"

Such satire is not unusual in Indian literature and scriptures, and a similar emphasis on understanding over superficial recitations is found in other ancient texts, such as chapter 7.103 of the Rig Veda. Signe Cohen notes that although this passage has been interpreted as satirical, animals are indeed often associated with wisdom and religious insight in this Upanishad.

John Oman, in his review of the satire in section 1.12 of the Chandogya Upanishad, states, "More than once we have the statement that ritual doings only provide merit in the other world for a time, whereas the right knowledge rids of all questions of merit and secures enduring bliss".

==== Structure of language and cosmic correspondences ====
The 13th volume of the first chapter lists mystical meanings in the structure and sounds of a chant. The text asserts that hāu, hāi, ī, atha, iha, ū, e, and hiṅ, among others, correspond to the empirical and divine world, such as the Moon, wind, the Sun, oneself, Agni, Prajapati, and so on. The thirteen syllables listed are "Stobhaksharas", sounds used in musical recitation of hymns, chants and songs. This volume is one of the many sections that do not fit with the preceding text or the text that follows.

The fourth verse of the 13th volume uses the word Upanishad, which Max Muller translates as "secret doctrine",and Patrick Olivelle translates as "hidden connections".

=== Second Prapāṭhaka ===
==== The significance of chant ====
The first volume of the second chapter states that the reverence for the entire Sāman (सामन्, chant) is sādhu (साधु, good), for three reasons. These reasons invoke three different contextual meanings of Sāman, namely abundance of goodness or value (सामन), friendliness or respect (सम्मान), and property goods or wealth (सामन्, also समान). The Chandogya Upanishad states that the reverse is also true, that people call it a-sāman when there is deficiency or worthlessness (ethics), unkindness or disrespect (human relationships), or lack of wealth (means of life, prosperity).

==== Everything in Universe chants ====
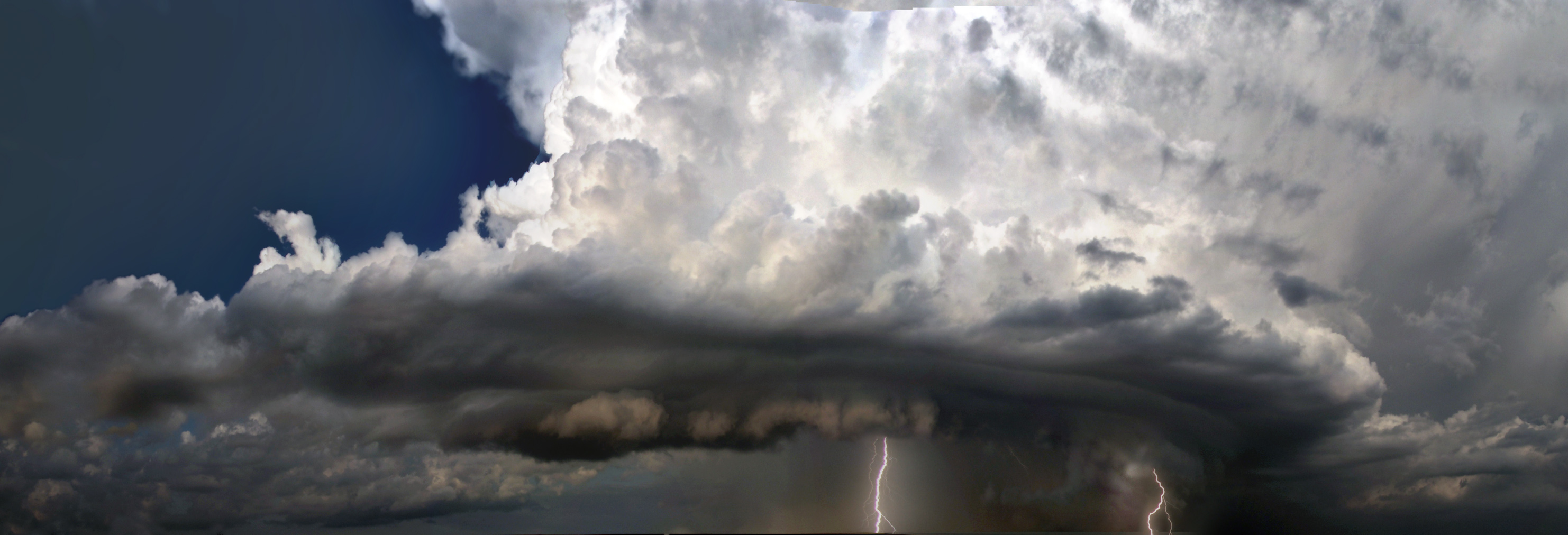
The Chandogya Upanishad describes natural phenomena such as a thunderstorm as a form of chant.

Volumes two through seven of the second Prapāthaka present analogies between various elements of the universe and elements of a chant. The latter include Hiṅkāra (हिङ्कार, preliminary vocalizing), Prastāva (प्रस्ताव, propose, prelude, introduction), Udgītha (उद्गीथ, sing, chant), Pratihāra (प्रतिहार, response, closing) and Nidhana (निधन, finale, conclusion). The sets of mapped analogies present interrelationships and include cosmic bodies, natural phenomena, hydrology, seasons, living creatures and human physiology. For example, chapter 2.3 of the Upanishad as translated by Robert Hume states,

In a rain-storm one should reverence a fivefold Sāman
The preceding winds is a Hiṅkāra.
A cloud is formed - that is Prastāva.
It rains - that is an 'Udgītha.
The lightens, it thunders - that is Pratihāra.
It lifts, that is Nidhana.

— Chandogya Upanishad 2.3.1

The eighth volume of the second chapter expands the five-fold chant structure to a seven-fold chant structure, wherein Ādi and Upadrava are the new elements of the chant. The day and daily life of a human being is mapped to the seven-fold structure in volumes 2.9 and 2.10 of the Upanishad.

Thereafter, the text returns to five-fold chant structure in volumes 2.11 through 2.21, with the new sections explaining the chant as the natural template for cosmic phenomena, psychological behavior, human copulation, human body structure, domestic animals, divinities, and others. The metaphorical theme in this volume of verses, asserts Paul Deussen, is that the Universe is an embodiment of Brahman, that the "chant" (Sāman) is interwoven into this entire universe and every phenomenon is a fractal manifestation of the ultimate reality. The 22nd volume of the second chapter discusses the structure of vowels (svara), consonants (sparsa), and sibilants (ushman).

==== The nature of Dharma and Ashramas (stages) theory ====
The Chandogya Upanishad in volume 23 of chapter two provides one of the earliest expositions of the broad, complex meaning of the Vedic concept of dharma. It includes the following as dharma – ethical duties such as charity to those in distress (dāna, दान), personal duties such as education and self-study (svādhyāya, स्वाध्याय, brahmacharya, ब्रह्मचर्य), and social rituals such as yajna (यज्ञ). The Upanishad describes the three branches of dharma as follows, as translated by Max Muller:

त्रयो धर्मस्कन्धा यज्ञोऽध्ययनं दानमिति प्रथमस्तप एव द्वितीयो ब्रह्मचार्याचार्यकुलवासी तृतीयोऽत्यन्तमात्मानमाचार्यकुलेऽवसादयन्सर्व एते पुण्यलोका भवन्ति ब्रह्मसँस्थोऽमृतत्वमेति ॥ १ ॥

There are three branches of the [Dharma] law. Sacrifice [Yajna], study [Svādhyāya] and charity [Dāna] are the first,
Austerity [Tapas] the second, and to dwell as a Brahmakarin [Brahmacharya] in the house of a tutor...is the third.
All these obtain the worlds of the blessed; but the Brahmasamstha alone (he who is firmly grounded in Brahman) obtains immortality.

— Chandogya Upanishad 2.23.1

This passage has been widely cited by ancient and medieval Sanskrit scholars as the forerunner to the asrama or age-based stages of dharmic life in Hinduism. The four asramas are: Brahmacharya (student), Grihastha (householder), Vanaprastha (retired) and Sannyasa (renunciation). Olivelle disagrees however, and states that even the explicit use of the term asrama or the mention of the "three branches of dharma" in section 2.23 of the Chandogya Upanishad does not necessarily indicate that the asrama system was meant.

Paul Deussen notes that the Chandogya Upanishad, in the above verse, does not present these stages as sequential, but rather as equal. Only three stages are explicitly described: Grihastha first, Vanaprastha second, and Brahmacharya third. Yet the verse also mentions the person in Brahmasamstha – a mention that has been a major topic of debate in the Vedanta sub-schools of Hinduism. Advaita Vedanta scholars state that this implicitly mentions the Sannyasa, whose goal is to get "knowledge, realization and thus firmly grounded in Brahman". Other scholars point to the structure of the verse and its explicit "three branches" declaration. In other words, the fourth state of Brahmasamstha among men must have been known by the time this Chandogya verse was composed, but it is not certain whether a formal stage of Sannyasa life existed as a dharmic asrama at that time. Beyond chronological concerns, the verse has provided a foundation for the Vedanta tradition's emphasis on ethics, education, simple living, social responsibility, and the ultimate goal of life as moksha through Brahman-knowledge.

The discussion of ethics and moral conduct in man's life re-appears in other chapters of the Chandogya Upanishad, such as in section 3.17.

=== Third Prapāṭhaka ===
==== Brahman is the sun of all existence, Madhu Vidya ====
The Chandogya Upanishad presents the "Madhu Vidya" ("Honey Knowledge" or "Nectar of Knowledge") in the first eleven volumes of the third chapter. The sun is praised as a source of all light and life, and is stated to be worthy of meditation in a symbolic representation of the sun as the "honey" of all Vedas. The Brahman is stated in these volumes of verses to be the sun of the universe, and the 'natural sun' is a phenomenal manifestation of the Brahman.

The simile of "honey" is extensively developed, with the Vedas, the Itihasa and mythological stories, and the Upanishads are described as flowers. The Rig hymns, the Yajur maxims, the Sama songs, the Atharva verses and the deeper, secret doctrines of the Upanishads are represented as the vehicles of rasa (nectar), that is the bees. The nectar itself is described as "essence [of knowledge], fame, glory of countenance, vigour, strength, and health". The sun is described as the honeycomb laden with glowing light of honey. The rising and setting of the sun are likened to man's cyclic state of clarity and confusion, while the spiritual state of knowing Upanishadic insight of Brahman is described in the Chandogya Upanishad as being one with the Sun, a state of permanent day of perfect knowledge, a day which knows no night.

==== Gayatri mantra: symbolism of all that is ====
Gayatri Mantra is the symbol of Brahman - the essence of everything, according to volume 3.12 of the Chandogya Upanishad. Gayatri, as speech, sings to all beings and protects them, states the text.

==== The Ultimate exists within oneself ====
The first six verses of the thirteenth volume of the Chandogya Upanishad's third chapter state a theory of Svarga (heaven) as human body, whose doorkeepers are eyes, ears, speech organs, mind and breath. To reach Svarga, asserts the text, that one must understand these doorkeepers. The Chandogya Upanishad then states that the ultimate heaven and highest world exists within oneself, as translated by Max Muller in the following passage,

अथ यदतः परो दिवो ज्योतिर्दीप्यते विश्वतः पृष्ठेषु सर्वतः पृष्ठेष्वनुत्तमेषूत्तमेषु लोकेष्विदं वाव तद्यदिदमस्मिन्नन्तः पुरुषो ज्योतिस्तस्यैषा

Now that light which shines above this heaven, higher than all, higher than everything, in the highest world, beyond which there are no other worlds, that is the same light which is within man.

— Chandogya Upanishad 3.13.7

This premise, that the human body is the heaven world, and that Brahman (highest reality) is identical to the Atman (Self) within a human being is at the foundation of Vedanta philosophy. The volume 3.13 of verses, goes on to offer proof in verse 3.13.8 that the highest reality is inside man, by stating that body is warm and this warmth must have an underlying hidden principle manifestation of the Brahman. Max Muller states, that while this reasoning may appear weak and incomplete, but it shows that Vedic era human mind had transitioned from "revealed testimony" to "evidence-driven and reasoned knowledge". This Brahman-Atman premise is more consciously and fully developed in section 3.14 of the Chandogya Upanishad.

==== Individual Self and the infinite Brahman is same, one's Self is God, Sandilya Vidya ====
The Upanishad presents the Śāṇḍilya doctrine in volume 14 of chapter three. This, states Paul Deussen, is with Satapatha Brahmana 10.6.3, perhaps the oldest passage in which the basic premises of the Vedanta philosophy are fully expressed, namely – Atman (Self inside man) exists, the Brahman is identical with Atman, God is inside man. The Chandogya Upanishad makes a series of statements in section 3.14 that have been frequently cited by later schools of Hinduism and modern studies on Indian philosophies. These are,

Brahman, you see, is this whole world. With inner tranquillity, one should venerate it as Tajjalan (that from which he came forth, as that into which he will be dissolved, as that in which he breathes). Now, then, man is undoubtedly made of his Kratumaya (क्रतुमयः, resolve, will, purpose). What a man becomes on departing from here after death is in accordance with his (will, resolve) in this world. So he should make this resolve:

This [S]elf (atman) of mine that lies deep within my heart — it is made of mind; the vital functions (prana) are its physical form; luminous is its appearance; the real is its intention; space is its essence (atman); it contains all actions, all desires, all smells, and all tastes; it has captured this whole world; it neither speaks nor pays any heed. This [S]elf (atman) of mine that lies deep within my heart—it is smaller than a grain of rice or barley, smaller than a mustard seed, smaller even than a millet grain or a millet kernel; but it is larger than the [E]arth, larger than the intermediate region, larger than the sky, larger even than all these worlds put together. This [S]elf (atman) of mine that lies deep within my heart—it contains all actions, all desires, all smells, and all tastes; it has captured this whole world; it neither speaks nor pays any heed. It is Brahman. On departing from here after death, I will become that. A man who has this resolve is never beset at all with doubts. This is what Shandilya used to say.

— Chandogya Upanishad 3.14.1 - 3.14.5

==== The Universe is an imperishable treasure chest ====
The Universe, states the Chandogya Upanishad in section 3.15, is a treasure chest and a refuge for man. This chest is where all wealth and everything rests, states verse 3.15.1, and it is imperishable, states verse 3.15.3. The best refuge for man is this Universe and the Vedas, assert verses 3.15.4 through 3.15.7. This section incorporates a benediction for the birth of a son.

==== Life is a festival, ethics is one's donation to it ====
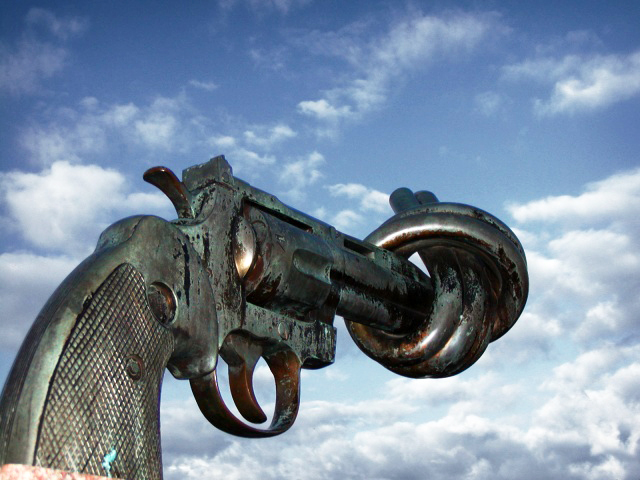
Ahimsa - non-violence in action, words and thoughts - is considered the highest ethical value and virtue in Hinduism. The Chandogya Upanishad makes one of the earliest mentions of this ethical code in section 3.17. Above: non-violence sculpture by Carl Fredrik Reutersward.

The section 3.17 of Chandogya Upanishad describes life as a celebration of a Soma-festival, whose dakshina (gifts, payment) is moral conduct and ethical precepts that includes non-violence, truthfulness, non-hypocrisy and charity unto others, as well as simple introspective life. This is one of the earliest statement of the Ahimsa principle as an ethical code of life, that later evolved to become the highest virtue in Hinduism. Jha, in his translation of section 3.17.4, states the following:

अथ यत्तपो दानमार्जवमहिँसा सत्यवचनमिति ता अस्य दक्षिणाः ॥ ४ ॥

Now Austerity [(Tapas, meditation)], Charity [(Dāna, alms-giving)], Uprightness [(Arjava, sincerity and non-hypocrisy)], Non-Violence [(Ahimsa, don't harm others)] and Truthfulness [(Satya-vacanam)], - these are his Sacrificial Fees [(Dakshina, gifts, payment to others)].

— Chandogya Upanishad 3.17.4

The metaphor of man's life as a Soma-festival is described through stages of a yajna (fire ritual ceremony) in section 3.17. The struggles of an individual, such as hunger, thirst and events that make him unhappy, are stated by the Upanishad, to represent Diksha (preparation, effort or consecration for the ceremony/festival). The prosperity of an individual, such as eating, drinking and experiencing the delights of life is Upasada (days during the ceremony/festival when some foods and certain foods are consumed as a community). When an individual lives a life of laughter, feasts and enjoyment of sexual intercourse, his life is akin to that of one who participates in the Stuta and Sastra hymns of a Soma-festival (hymns that are recited and set to music), states verse 3.17.3 of the text. Death is like ablution after the ceremony.

The volumes 3.16 and 3.17 of the Chandogya Upanishad are notable for two additional assertions. First, verse 3.16.7 states that the normal lifespan of a man is 116 years, divided into three stages of 24, 44 and 48 years each. These verses suggest a developed state of mathematical sciences and addition by about 800-600 BCE. Second, verse 3.17.6 mentions Krishna Devakiputra (Sanskrit: कृष्णाय देवकीपुत्रा) as a student of sage Ghora Angirasa. This mention of "Krishna as the son of Devaki", has been studied by scholars as a potential source of fables and Vedic lore about the major deity Krishna in the Mahabharata and other ancient literature. Scholars have also questioned whether this part of the verse is an interpolation, or refers to a different Krishna Devikaputra than the deity Krishna, because the much later Sandilya Bhakti Sutras, a treatise on Krishna, cites later compilations such as the Narayana Upanishad and Atharvasiras 6.9, but never cites this verse of Chandogya Upanishad. Others state that the coincidence of both names, of Krishna and Devika, in the same verse cannot be dismissed easily and that this Krishna may be the same as one figure found later, such as in the Bhagavad Gita.

Verse 3.17.6 states that, Krishna Devikaputra after learning the theory that life is a Soma-festival, learnt the following Vedic hymn of refuge for an individual on his death bed, as translated by Duessen:

एतत्त्रयं प्रतिपद्येताक्षितमस्यच्युतमसि प्राणसꣳशितमसीति तत्रैते द्वे ऋचौ भवतः ॥ ६ ॥
Thou art the indestructible [Aksitamasi, imperishable, undecaying)]
Thou art the imperturbable [Acyutamasi, unchangeable, imperishable)]
Thou art the crest (or the spearhead) vital breaths [(Prana-samsitamasi, fountainhead)]!

— Chandogya Upanishad 3.17.6

=== Fourth Prapāṭhaka ===
==== Samvargavidya ====
The fourth chapter of the Chandogya Upanishad opens with the story of king Janasruti and "the man with the cart" named Raikva. The moral of the story is called, Samvarga (Sanskrit: संवर्ग, devouring, gathering, absorbing) Vidya, summarized in volume 4.3 of the text. Air, asserts the Upanishad, is the "devourer unto itself" of divinities because it absorbs fire, [S]un at sunset, [M]oon when it sets, water when it dries up. In reference to man, Prana (vital breath, life-principle) is the "devourer unto itself" because when one sleeps, Prana absorbs all deities inside man such as eyes, ears and mind. The Samvarga Vidya in Chandogya is found elsewhere in Vedic canon of texts, such as chapter 10.3.3 of Shatapatha Brahmana and sections 2.12 - 2.13 of Kaushitaki Upanishad. Paul Deussen states that the underlying message of Samvarga Vidya is that the cosmic phenomenon and the individual physiology are mirrors, and therefore man should know himself as identical with all cosmos and all beings.

The story is notable for its characters, charity practices, and its mention and its definitions of Brāhmaṇa and Ṡūdra. King Janasruti is described as pious, extremely charitable, feeder of many destitutes, who built rest houses to serve the people in his kingdom, but one who lacked the knowledge of Brahman-Atman. Raikva, is mentioned as "the man with the cart", very poor and of miserable plight (with sores on his skin), but he has the Brahman-Atman knowledge that is, "his self is identical with all beings". The rich generous king is referred to as Ṡūdra, while the poor working man with the cart is called Brāhmaṇa (one who knows the Brahman knowledge). The story thus declares knowledge as superior to wealth and power. The story also declares the king as a seeker of knowledge, and eager to learn from the poorest. Paul Deussen notes that this story in the Upanishad, is strange and out of place with its riddles.

==== Satyakama's education ====
The Upanishad presents another symbolic conversational story of Satyakama, the son of Jabala, in volumes 4.4 through 4.9. Satyakama's mother reveals to the boy, in the passages of the Upanishad, that she went from place to place in her youth, and that he was of uncertain parentage. The boy, eager for knowledge, goes to the sage Haridrumata Gautama, requesting the sage's permission to live in his school as part of his Brahmacharya. The teacher asks, "My dear child, what family do you come from?" Satyakama replies that he is of uncertain parentage because his mother does not know who his father is. The sage declares that the boy's honesty is the mark of a "Brāhmaṇa, true seeker of the knowledge of the Brahman". The sage accepts him as a student in his school.

The sage sends Satyakama to tend four hundred cows, and tells him to come back when they multiply to a thousand. The symbolic legend then presents conversations of Satyakama with a bull, a fire, a swan (Hamsa, हंस) and a diver bird (Madgu, मद्गु), which respectively symbolize, Vayu, Agni, Āditya and Prāṇa. Satyakama then learns from these creatures that forms of Brahman are present in all cardinal directions (north, south, east, west), world-bodies (earth, atmosphere, sky and ocean), sources of light (fire, Sun, Moon, lightning), and in man (breath, eye, ear and mind). Satyakama returns to his teacher with a thousand cows, and humbly learns the rest of the nature of Brahman.

The story is notable for declaring that the mark of a student of Brahman is not parentage, but honesty. The story is also notable for the repeated use of the word Bhagavan to a mean teacher during the Vedic era.

==== Penance is unnecessary, Brahman as life bliss joy and love, the story of Upakosala ====
The volumes 4.10 through 4.15 of the Chandogya Upanishad present the third conversational story of a student named 'Upakosala'. The boy Satyakama Jabala, described in volumes 4.4 through 4.9 of the text, is now the adult Guru (teacher) with whom Upakosala has been studying for twelve years as part of his Brahmacharya.

Upakosala has a conversation with sacrificial fires, which inform him that Brahman is life, Brahman is joy and bliss, Brahman is infinity, and that the means to realizing Brahman does not involve gloomy or hard penance. The fires then enumerate the manifestations of Brahman as being everywhere in the empirically perceived world. Satyakama joins Upakosala's education and explains, in volume 4.15 of the text, as translated by Patrick Olivelle:

य एषोऽक्षिणि पुरुषो दृश्यत एष आत्मेति होवाचैतदमृतमभयमेतद्ब्रह्मेति

The person you see here in the eye — he is the [S]elf (atman)" he told him. "He is the immortal free from fear; he is Brahman.

— Chandogya Upanishad 4.15.1

The Upanishad asserts in verses 4.15.2 and 4.15.3 that the Atman is the "stronghold of love", the leader of love, and that it assembles and unites all that inspires love. Those who find and realize the Atman, find and realize the Brahman, states the text.

=== Fifth Prapāṭhaka ===
==== The noblest and the best ====
The fifth chapter of the Chandogya Upanishad opens with the declaration, as translated by Patrick Olivelle:

यो ह वै ज्येष्ठं च श्रेष्ठं च वेद ज्येष्ठश्च ह वै श्रेष्ठश्च भवति

When a man knows the best and the greatest, he becomes the best and the greatest.

— Chandogya Upanishad 5.1.1

The first volume of the fifth chapter of the text tells a fable and prefaces each character with the maxims in its first verse - He who knows excellence, becomes excellent. He who knows stability, becomes stable. He who knows success, becomes successful. He who knows home, becomes home for others.

The fable, found in many other principal Upanishads, describes a rivalry between the eyes, ears, speech and mind. They all individually claim to be "most excellent, most stable, most successful, most homely". They ask their father, Prajapati, who is the noblest and best among them. Prajapati states, "He by whose departure, the body is worst off, is the one". Each rivaling organ leaves for a year, and the body suffers but is not worse off. Then, Prana (breath, the life-principle) prepares to leave, and all of them insist that he stay. Prana, they acknowledge, empowers them all.

The section 5.2 is notable for mentioning the ritual use of kañsa (a goblet-like musical instrument) and chamasa (a spoon shaped object).

==== The five fires and two paths theory ====
Volumes 5.3 through 5.10 of the Chandogya Upanishad present the "Panchagnividya", or the doctrine of "five fires and two paths in afterlife". These sections are nearly identical to those found in section 14.9.1 of Sathapatha Brahmana, in section 6.2 of Brihadaranyaka Upanishad, and in chapter one of Kaushitaki Upanishad. Paul Deussen states, that the presence of this doctrine in multiple ancient texts suggests that this idea is older than these texts, was established, and was an important concept in the cultural fabric of ancient times. There are differences between the versions of manuscript and among the ancient texts, particularly related to reincarnation in different castes based on "satisfactory conduct" and "stinking conduct" in a previous life, which Deussen suggests may be a supplement inserted into the Chandogya Upanishad at a later date.

The two paths of afterlife, states the text, are Devayana – the path of the Devas (gods), and Pitryana – the path of the fathers. The path of the fathers, in afterlife, is for those who live a life of rituals, sacrifices, social service and charity. These individuals enter heaven, but stay there in proportion to their merit in their just completed life, then they return to Earth to be born as rice, herbs, trees, sesame, beans, animals or human beings depending on their conduct in past life. The path of the Devas, is for those who live a life of knowledge or those who enter the forest life of Vanaprastha and pursue knowledge, faith and truthfulness. These individuals do not return to Earth, and in their afterlife join with the Brahman.

All existence is a cycle of fire, asserts the text, and the five fires are: the cosmos as an altar where the fuel is the Sun from which rises the Moon; the cloud as an altar where the fuel is air from which rises the rain; the Earth as an altar where the fuel is time (year) from which food (crops) arises; the man as an altar where the fuel is speech from which semen arises; and the woman as an altar where the fuel is the sexual organ from which the fetus arises. The baby is born in the tenth month, lives a life, and when he dies, they carry him and return him to the fire because the fire is where he arose, whence he came out of.

The verse 5.10.8 of the Chandogya Upanishad is notable for two assertions. First, it adds a third way for tiny living creatures (flies, insects and worms) that neither take the Devayana nor the Pitryana path after their death. Second, the text asserts that rebirth is the reason why the yonder-world (the world where living creatures in their afterlife stay temporarily) never becomes full . These assertions suggest an attempt to address rationalization, curiosities and challenges concerning the reincarnation theory.

==== Who is our Atman (Self), what is the Brahman ====
The Chandogya Upanishad opens volume 5.11 with five adults seeking knowledge. The adults are described as five great householders and great theologians who once came together and held a discussion as to what is our Self, and what is Brahman?

The five householders approach a sage named Uddalaka Aruni, who admits his knowledge is deficient, and suggests that they all go to king Asvapati Kaikeya, who knows about the Universal Ātman (soul). When the knowledge seekers arrive, the king pays his due respect to them, gives them gifts, but the five ask him about Vaishvanara Self.

The answer that follows is referred to as the "doctrine of Atman Vaishvanara", where Vaishvanara literally means "One in the Many", which refers to "the All-self, the God". The entire doctrine is also found in other ancient Indian texts such as the Satapatha Brahmana (section 10.6.1). The common essence of the theory, as found in various ancient Indian texts, is that "the inner fire, the Self, is universal and common in all men, whether they are friends or foes, good or bad". The Chandogya Upanishad's narrative is notable for stating the idea of "unity of the Universe, of realization of this unity with man, and that there is unity of the Atman". This idea of universal Self, understood as including both the individual and the cosmos, became a subject of interpretation and conjecture among Vedanta theologians.

=== Sixth Prapāṭhaka ===
==== Atman exists, Svetaketu's education on the key to all knowledge - Tat Tvam Asi ====
According to Deutsch and Dalvi, "the entire sixth chapter is no doubt the most influential of the entire corpus of the Upanishads." It contains the famous dictum "Tat Tvam Asi," traditionally interpreted as "That Thou Art," and as such the most influential of the Upanishadic statements, yet, according to Brereton, followed by Olivelle and Doniger, the correct translation is "That's how you are."

The statement is repeated nine times at the end of sections 6.8 through 6.16 of the Upanishad,

स य एषोऽणिमैतदात्म्यमिदँ सर्वं तत्सत्यँ स आत्मा तत्त्वमसि श्वेतकेतो

The traditional translation is "That you are":

- "This [U]niverse consists of what that finest essence is, it is the real, it is the Self, that thou art, O Śvetaketu!"
- "That which is the finest essence – this whole world has that as its Self. That is Reality. That is Atman (Self). That art thou, Śvetaketu."

Yet, according to Brereton, followed by Olivelle and Doniger, the correct translation is "That's how you are":

- "That which is this finest essence, that the whole world has as its self. That is the truth. That is the self. In that way are you, Śvetaketu."
- "The finest essence [the existent] here — that constitutes the self of this whole world; that is the truth; that is the self (atman). And that's how you are, Śvetaketu."

The Tat Tvam Asi dictum emerges in a teaching conversation between a father and son, Uddalaka Aruni and 24-year-old Śvetaketu Aruneya respectively, after the father sends his son to study the Vedas, saying "take up the celibate life of a student, for there is no one in our family, my son, who has not studied and is the kind of Brahmin who is so only because of birth." The son returns after studying the Vedas for twelve years, "swell-headed [and] arrogant." The father inquires if Śvetaketu has asked about that by which "we perceive what cannot be perceived, we know what cannot be known"? Śvetaketu admits he hasn't done so, and asks what that is. His father explains this through 16 volumes of verses of the Chandogya Upanishad.

Uddalaka states in volume 1 of chapter 6 of the Upanishad, that the essence of clay, gold, copper and iron can each be understood by studying a pure lump of clay, gold, copper and iron respectively. The various objects produced from these materials do not change the essence, rather they change the form. Thus, to understand something, studying the essence of one, is the path to understanding the numerous manifested forms.

In volume 2, Uddalaka, rejects the idea that the world was born from the non-existent [a-sat], asserting that "in the beginning this world was simply what is existent [sat] - one only, without a second." (Note: Existent: सत्, Sat, Truth, Reality, Being; non-existent: असत्, A-sat, Nothingness, non-Being.) The existent thought "let me become many," emitting heat. From the heat emitted water, which in turn emitted food.

In the verses of volume 3, Uddalaka asserts that life emerges through three routes: from an egg, through direct birth of a living being, and from life sprouting from seeds. The Sat enters these and gives them individuality, states the Upanishad. Heat, food and water nourish all living beings, regardless of the route by which they are born. Each of these forms of nourishment has three constituents, asserts the Upanishad in volumes 4 through 7 of the sixth chapter. It calls these the coarse, the medium and the finest essence. The coarsest essence becomes waste, the medium essence builds the body and the finest essence nourishes the mind. Section 6.7 states that the mind depends on the body and proper food, breath depends on hydration of the body, while voice depends on warmth in the body.

In 8.1 to 6, after setting this foundation of premises, in 6.8.1 to 6.8.6, Uddalaka states that heat, food, water, mind, breath and voice have ultimately the existent (sat) as their root. This existent is the root of each living being. To say that there is no root, no core is incorrect, because "nothing is without a root cause", assert verses 6.8.3 through 6.8.6 of the Upanishad.

The translations and interpretations diverge on the famous dictum tat tvam asi in 6.8.7. While tat is traditionally interpreted as referring to either 'the existent' (sat) or 'finest essence' (animan), Brereton has argued that this is grammatically incorrect, and that the phrase, as explained by Olivelle, "does not establish the identity between the individual and the ultimate being (sat) but rather shows that Svetaketu lives in the same manner as all other creatures, that is, by means of an invisible and subtle essence," which is also the cause of his existence. In the traditional interpretation, 6.8.7 then states that Sat, Existence, Being is this root, it is the essence (atman), it is at the core of all living beings. It is True, it is Real, it is the Self (atman), and Thou Art That, Śvetaketu. In Brereton's interpretation, followed by Olivelle and Doniger, Uddalaka states that "that's how you are," Śvetaketu.

The "Tat Tvam Asi" phrase is a Mahavakya, a statement which leads directly to knowledge of Brahman.

==== Oneness in the world, the immanent reality and of Man ====
The Chandogya Upanishad in volume 6.9, states that all Selfs are interconnected and one. The inmost essence of all beings is same, the whole world is One Truth, One Reality, One Self.

Living beings are like rivers that arise in the mountains, states the Upanishad, some rivers flow to the east and some to the west, yet they end in an ocean, become the ocean itself, and realize they are not different but are same, and thus realize their Oneness. Uddalaka states in volume 6.10 of the Upanishad, that there comes a time when all human beings and all creatures know not, "I am this one, I am that one", but realize that they are One Truth, One Reality, and the whole world is one Atman.

Living beings are like trees, asserts the Upanishad, that bleed when struck and injured, yet the tree lives on with its Self as resplendent as before. It is this Atman, that despite all the suffering inflicted on a person, makes him to stand up again, live and rejoice at life. Body dies, life doesn't.

The Self and the body are like salt and water, states the Upanishad in volume 6.13. Salt dissolves in water, it is everywhere in the water, it cannot be seen, yet it is there and exists forever no matter what one does to the water. The Sat is forever, and this Sat is the Self, the essence, it exists, it is true, asserts the text.

Man's journey to self-knowledge and self-realization, states volume 6.14 of Chandogya Upanishad, is like a man who is taken from his home in Gandharas, with his eyes covered, into a forest full of life-threatening dangers and delicious fruits, but no human beings. He lives in confusion, till one day he removes the eye cover. He then finds his way out of the forest, then finds knowledgeable ones for directions to Gandharas. He receives the directions, and continues his journey on his own, one day arriving home and to happiness. The commentators to this section of Chandogya Upanishad explain that in this metaphor, the home is Sat (Truth, Reality, Brahman, Atman), the forest is the empirical world of existence, the "taking away from his home" is symbolism for man's impulsive living and his good and evil deeds in the empirical world, eye cover represent his impulsive desires, removal of eye cover and attempt to get out of the forest represent the seekings about meaning of life and introspective turn to within, the knowledgeable ones giving directions is symbolism for spiritual teachers and guides.

=== Seventh Prapāṭhaka ===
==== From knowledge of the outer world to the knowledge of the inner world ====
The seventh chapter of the Chandogya Upanishad opens as a conversation between Sanatkumara and Narada. The latter asks, "teach me, Sir, the knowledge of Self, because I hear that anyone who knows the Self, is beyond suffering and sorrow".

Sanatkumara first inquires from Narada what he already has learned so far. Narada says, he knows the Rig Veda, the Samaveda, the Yajur Veda, the Atharva Veda, the epics and the history, the myths and the ancient stories, all rituals, grammar, etymology, astronomy, time keeping, mathematics, politics and ethics, warfare, principles of reasoning, divine lore, prayer lore, snake charming, ghosts lore and fine arts. Narada admits to Sanatkumara that none of these have led him to Self-knowledge, and he wants to know about Self and Self-knowledge.

Sanatkumara states that Narada, with the worldly knowledge, has so far focussed on name. Adore and revere the worldly knowledge asserts Sanatkumara in section 7.1 of the Upanishad, but meditate on all that knowledge as the name, as Brahman. Narada asks Sanatkumara to explain, and asks what is better than the worldly knowledge. In volumes 2 through 26 of the seventh chapter, the Upanishad presents, in the words of Sanatkumara, a hierarchy of progressive meditation, from outer (external) worldly knowledge to inner worldly knowledge, from finite current knowledge to infinite Atman knowledge, as a step-wise journey to Self and infinite bliss. This hierarchy, as per Paul Deussen, is strange, convoluted possibly to incorporate divergent prevailing ideas in the ancient times. Yet in its full presentation, Deussen remarks, "it is magnificent, excellent in construction, and commands an elevated view of man's deepest nature".

==== Narada's education on progressive meditation ====
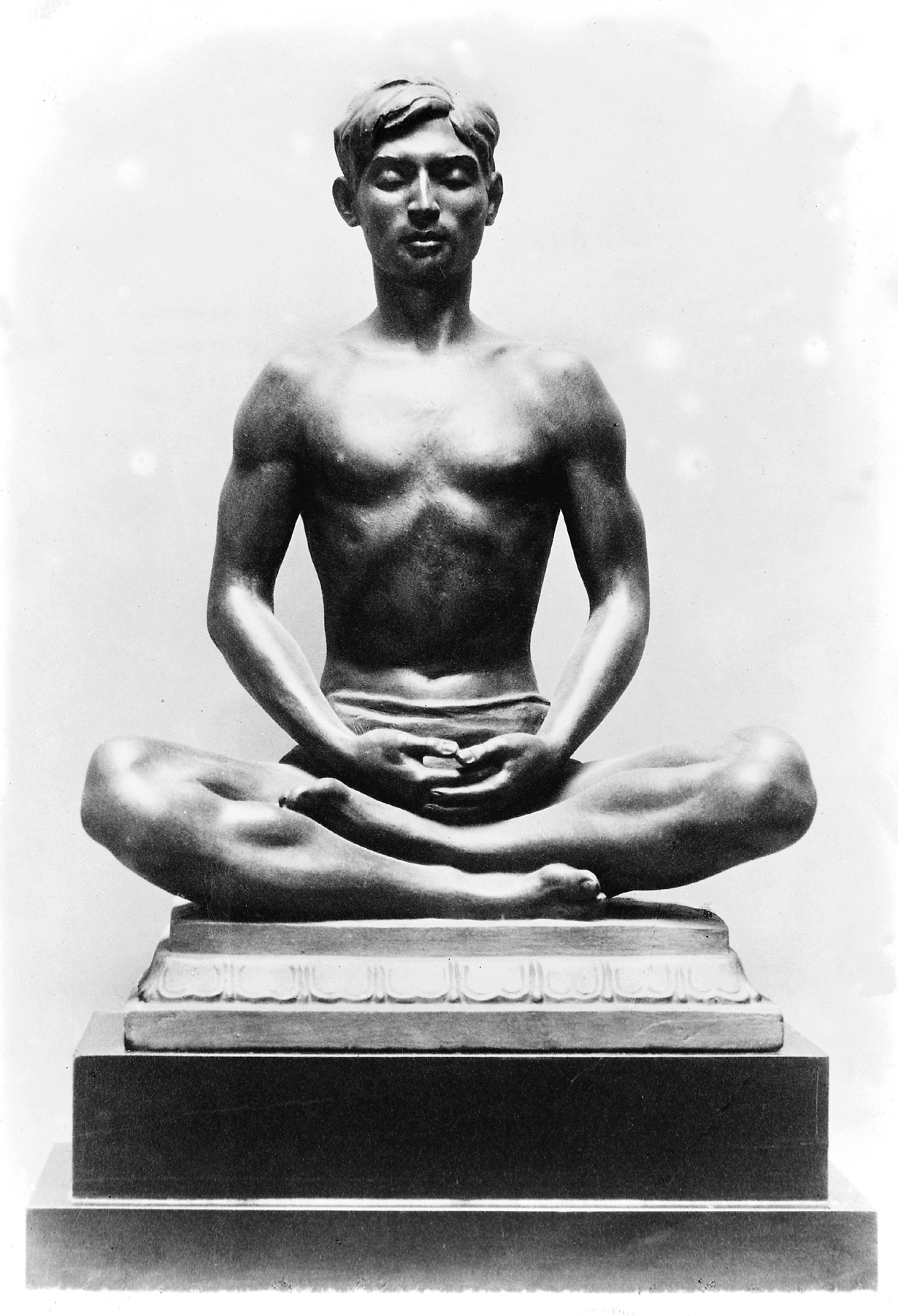
The Chandogya Upanishad (7th chapter) discusses progressive meditation as a means to Self-knowledge.

In its exposition of progressive meditation for Self-knowledge, the Chandogya Upanishad starts by referring to the external worldly knowledge as Name.

Deeper than this Name is Speech, asserts verse 7.2.1, because speech is what communicates all external worldly knowledge as well as what is right and what is wrong, what is true and what is false, what is good and what is bad, what is pleasant and what is unpleasant. Without speech, man can not share this knowledge, and one must adore and revere speech as a manifestation of Brahman.

More elevated than Speech, asserts section 7.3 of the Upanishad, is Manas (मनस्, mind) because the mind holds both Speech and Name (external worldly knowledge). One must adore and revere Mind as Brahman. Deeper than Mind, asserts section 7.4 of the Upanishad, is Sankalpa (सङ्कल्प, will, conviction, intention) because when a man wills he applies his mind, when a man applies his mind he engages with Speech and Name. One must adore and revere Will as a manifestation of Brahman. Higher than Will, states section 7.5 of the Upanishad, is Chitta (चित्त, thought, consciousness) because when a man thinks he forms his Will. One must adore and revere Thought as a manifestation of Brahman. Greater than Thought, asserts section 7.6 of the Upanishad, is Dhyanam (ध्यान, meditation, reflection, contemplation) because when a man meditates he thinks. One must adore and revere Meditation as a manifestation of Brahman. Deeper than Meditation, states section 7.7 of the Upanishad, is Vijñana (विज्ञान, knowledge, understanding, discernment) because when a man understands he continues meditating. One must adore and revere Understanding as Brahman.

Thereafter, for a few steps, the Upanishad asserts a hierarchy of progressive meditation that is unusual and different from the broader teachings of the Upanishads. The text states in section 7.8, that higher than Understanding is Bala (बल, strength, vigor) because a strong man physically prevails over the men with understanding. "By strength does the world stand", states verse 7.8.1 of Chandogya Upanishad. One must adore and revere Strength as a manifestation of Brahman. Higher than Strength, states section 7.9 of the Upanishad, is Anna (अन्नं, food, nourishment) because with proper food, man becomes strong. One must adore and revere Food as a manifestation of Brahman. Greater than Food, states section 7.10 of the Upanishad, is Āpah (आप, water) because without water one cannot grow food, famines strike and living creatures perish. One must adore and revere Water as Brahman. Higher than Water, asserts section 7.11 of the Upanishad, is Tejas (तेजस्, heat, fire) because it is the heat combined with the wind and the atmosphere that brings rainwater. One must adore and revere Heat as a manifestation of Brahman. Higher than Heat, states section 7.12 of the Upanishad, is Ākāsa (आकाश, space, ether) because it is in space where the Sun, the Moon, the stars and the heat reside. One must adore and revere Space as Brahman.

The Upanishad thereafter makes an abrupt transition back to the inner world of man. The text states in section 7.13, that deeper than Space is Smara (स्मरो, memory) because without Memory, the [U]niverse would be as if it did not exist to man. One must adore and revere Memory as a manifestation of Brahman, states the text. Deeper than Memory is Asha (आशा, hope), states section 7.14 of the Upanishad, because kindled by hope memory develops and man acts. One must adore and revere Hope as Brahman. Still deeper than Hope is Prāna (प्राणो, vital breath, life-principle), because the life-principle is the hub of all that defines a man, and not his body. That is why, asserts the text, people cremate a dead body and respect a living person with the same body. The one who knows the life-principle, states the Upanishad, becomes Ativadin (speaker with inner confidence, speaker of excellence).

==== From Ativadin to self-knowledge ====
The Chandogya Upanishad, in sections 7.16 through 7.26 presents a series of connected statements relayed from Sage Sanatkumara to Narada, as follows (a paraphrase below)

Now, a man talks only when he talks with truth, hence you should seek to perceive the truth (Satya, सत्य).
A man must first perceive before he speaks the truth, so it is perception/comprehension (Vijñana, विज्ञान) that you should seek to understand.
A man must first think before he perceives, so it is thinking/thought (Mati, मति) that you should seek perceive.
A man must first have faith before he thinks, so it is faith (Śraddhā, श्रद्दधा) that he should seek to perceive.
A man must first produce before he has faith, so it is production/growing forth (Nististhati, निस्तिष्ठति) that you should seek to perceive.
A man must first act before he produces, so it is action (Krti, कृति) that you should seek to perceive.
A man must first attain well-being before he acts, so it is well-being (Sukham, सुखं) that you should seek to perceive.
Now, well-being is nothing but plenitude/limitlessness (Bhuman, भूमानं). There is no prosperity in scarcity. So, it is plenitude that you should seek to perceive.
Where a man sees, hears, or discerns no other thing — that is plenitude. Plenitude is based on one's own greatness or maybe it's not based on greatness. Cattle, slaves, farms & houses, etc - these are what people here call greatness. But I don't consider them that way, for they are all based on each other. Plenitude and 'I' are indeed the same, and is the north, south, east, west & extends over the whole world. A man who sees it this way, thinks about it this way, and perceives it this way; a man who finds pleasure in the Self, who dallies with the Self, who mates with the Self, and who attains bliss in the Self — he becomes completely his own master; he obtains complete freedom/autonomy (Svaraj, स्वराज्) of movement in all the worlds.

— Chandogya Upanishad 7.16-7.26

To one who sees, perceives and understands Self as Truth, asserts the Upanishad in section 7.26, the life-principle springs from the Self, hope springs from the Self, memory springs from the Self, as does mind, thought, understanding, reflection, conviction, speech, and all the external worldly knowledge.

=== Eighth Prapāṭhaka ===
==== The nature of knowledge and Atman (Self) ====
The eighth chapter of the Chandogya Upanishad opens by declaring the body into which one is born to be the "city of Brahman", and in it is a special palace because the entire Universe is contained within it. Whatever has been, whatever will be, whatever is, and whatever is not, is all inside that palace, asserts the text, and the resident of the palace is Brahman, the Self. Those who do not discover that Self within themselves are unfree, states the text; those who do discover this self-knowledge gain ultimate freedom in all the worlds. The Upanishad describes the potential of self-knowledge with the parable of hidden treasure, as follows,:

[Where Brahman dwells], there are all our true desires, but hidden by what is false. As people who do not know the country, walk again and again over undiscovered gold that is hidden below inside the earth, thus do people live with Brahman and yet do not discover it because they do not seek to discover the true Self in that Brahman dwelling inside them.

— Chandogya Upanishad 8.3.2

Man has many desires of food and drink, song and music, friends and objects, and fulfillment of those desires make him happy, states the Chandogya Upanishad in sections 8.2 and 8.3; but those desires are fleeting, and so is the happiness that their fulfillment provides, because both are superficial and veiled in untruth. Man impulsively becomes a servant of his unfulfilled superficial desires, instead of reflecting on his true desires. Serenity comes from knowing his true desire to know the Self and from realizing the Self within oneself, asserts the text.

Theosophist Charles Johnston describes this section as expressing a Law of Correspondence, in which the macrocosm of the Universe is presented as a microcosm within man, and all that is infinite and divine is within man, so that man is the temple and God dwells inside him.

==== The means to knowledge and Atman ====
The Upanishad in section 8.5 and 8.6 states that the life of a student (Brahmacharin, see Brahmacharya) guided by a teacher is the means to attain knowledge, and the process of meditation and search are the means to realize Atman. The verse 8.5.1 asserts that such a life of a student is same as the yajna (fire ritual), the istam (oblations offered during the fire ritual), the sattrayanam (community fire ritual festival), the maunam (ritual of ascetic silence), the anasakayanam (fasting ritual), and the aranyayanam (a hermit life of solitude in the forest). The section thus states that all the external forms of rituals are equivalently achievable internally when someone becomes a student of the sacred knowledge and seeks to know the Brahman-Atman. The section is notable for the mention of "hermit's life in the forest" cultural practice, in verse 8.5.3.

==== The false and true in relation to the Atman ====
The sections 8.7 through 8.12 of the Chandogya Upanishad return to the question, "what is the true Self, and what is not"? The opening passage declares the Self to be the one that is eternally free of grief, suffering and death; it is happy, serene being that desires, feels and thinks what it ought to. Thereafter, the text structures its analysis of the true and false Atman as four answers. The three Self, which the text asserts as false Self, consists of the material body, the corporeal self in dreams, and the individual self in deep sleep, while the fourth is the true Self – the self beyond the deep sleep state that is one with others and the entire Universe.

This theory is also known as the "four states of consciousness", explained as the awake state, dream-filled sleep state, deep sleep state, and the state beyond the deep sleep state.

==== A paean to learning, a reverence for the Self ====
With the knowledge of Brahman, asserts the text, one goes from darkness to perceiving a spectrum of colors and shakes off evil. This knowledge of the Self is immortal, and the one who knows the Self joins the glory of the Brahman-knowers, the glory of Rajas (kings) and the glory of the people. The one who knows the Self, continues to study the Vedas and concentrates on the Self, is harmless towards all living beings, and thus lives his entire life, reaches the Brahma-world and does not return, states the Chandogya Upanishad in its closing chapter.

== Influence ==
According to Max Muller, the Chandogya Upanishad is notable for its lilting metric structure, its mention of ancient cultural elements such as musical instruments, and embedded philosophical premises that later served as foundation for Vedanta school of Hinduism. According to Deutsch and Dalvi, "the entire sixth chapter is no doubt the most influential of the entire corpus of the Upanishads."

Chandogya Upanishad is one of the most cited texts in later Bhasyas (reviews and commentaries) by scholars from the diverse schools of Hinduism. Several major "Bhasyas" (reviews, commentaries) on Chandogya Upanishad have been written by Sanskrit scholars of ancient and medieval India. These include those by Adi Shankaracharya, Madhvacharya, Dramidacharya, Brahmanandi Tankacharya, and Ramanujacharya. Adi Shankaracharya, for example, cited the Chandogya Upanishad 810 times in his Vedanta Sutra Bhasya, more than any other ancient text.

Max Muller has translated, commented and compared the Chandogya Upanishad with ancient texts outside India. For example, the initial chapters of the Upanishad is full of an unusual and fanciful etymology section, but Muller notes that this literary stage and similar etymological fancy is found in the scriptures associated with Moses and his people in their Exodus across the Red Sea, as well as in the Christian literature related to Saint Augustine of the 5th century CE.

Klaus Witz in his review of the Chandogya Upanishad states, "the opulence of its chapters is difficult to communicate: the most diverse aspects of the [U]niverse, life, mind and experience are developed into inner paths. (...) Chapters VI-VII consist of vidyas of great depth and profundity".

John Arapura states, "The Chandogya Upanishad sets forth a profound philosophy of language as chant, in a way that expresses the centrality of the Self and its non-duality".

The philosopher Arthur Schopenhauer admired and often quoted from the Chandogya Upanishad, particularly the phrase "Tat tvam asi", which he would render in German as "Dies bist du", and equate in English to “This art thou.” One important teaching of the Chandogya Upanishad, according to Schopenhauer, is that compassion sees past individuation, comprehending that each individual is merely a manifestation of the one's will; you are the world as a whole. Each and every living creature is understood, in this Chandogya Upanishad-inspired fundamental doctrine of Hinduism, to be a manifestation of the same underlying nature, where there is a deep sense of interconnected oneness in every person and every creature, and that singular nature renders each individual being identical to every other.

== See also ==
- Isha Upanishad
- Katha Upanishad
- Mahāvākyas

== Sources ==
- Deussen, Paul (2017). Sixty Upanishads of the Veda, Volume 1. Motilal Banarsidass. ISBN 978-8120814684.
- Deutsch, Eliot; Dalvi, Rohit (2004). The Essential Vedanta. A New Source Book of Advaita Vedanta. World Wisdom.
- Muller, Max. The Upanishads, Part I. Oxford University Press.
- Olivelle, Patrick (2008) [1996]. Upanishads. A New Translation by Patrick Olivelle. Oxford University Press.
- Olivelle, Patrick (1998). The Early Upanisads. Oxford University Press New York, NY. ISBN 978-0-19-512435-4.
