= David Paton (disambiguation) =

David Paton (born 1949) is a Scottish bassist, guitarist and singer.

David Paton may also refer to:

- David Paton (architect) (1801–1882), Scots-born architect known for North Carolina State Capitol
- David Paton (artist) (fl. 1660–1670), Scottish portrait miniature artist
- Dave Paton (canoeist), American slalom canoeist, see 1989 Canoe Slalom World Cup
- David Paton (doctor) (1912–2008), British Army medical officer
- David Paton (footballer) (1943–2020), Scottish footballer for Southampton F.C.
- David Paton (missionary) (1913-1992), a British missionary to China
- David Paton (ophthalmologist) (1930–2025), founder of an ophthalmological charity
- David Paton (politician), Member of the South Australian House of Assembly for Ngadjuri
- David C. Paton, conservation ecologist, ornithologist, academic, and author

== See also ==
- David Patten (disambiguation)
- David Patton (disambiguation)
