= David Patton =

David Patton may refer to:

- David Henry Patton (1837–1914), American congressman
- David Patton (baseball) (born 1984), Major League Baseball pitcher

== See also ==
- David Patten (disambiguation)
- David Paton (disambiguation)
