= William Paton (ecumenist) =

British ecumenist

William Paton (1886–1943) was a British ecumenist. Active in the Student Christian Movement, Paton was the first general secretary of the National Christian Council of India and helped to establish the World Council of Churches.

== Biography ==
Born in London to Scottish parents, Paton converted to Christianity in spring 1905 in his first year studying at Pembroke College, Oxford and joined the Presbyterian Church of England. He quickly became involved in itinerant preaching in country churches around Oxford and the activities of the Student Christian Movement of Great Britain, and pursued theological studies at Westminster College, Cambridge.

Paton worked as a Presbyterian missionary in India, first from 1916 until 1919, then returning in 1921 and becoming the first general secretary National Christian Council of India (1922–1926). He became part of the International Missionary Council, succeeding J. H. Oldham as general secretary, then helped to establish the World Council of Churches with Willem Visser 't Hooft.

In 1911, Paton married Grace Mackenzie MacDonald. She was the daughter of a minister of a Presbyterian Church in London where Paton had been invited to preach at. Grace would later leave the Presbyterian Church, then the Church of England because they did not care for the poor. She converted to Roman Catholicism in 1936.

== See also ==
- David Paton (1913–1992)

== Works ==
- Paton, William (1916). Jesus Christ and the World’s Religions. London: United Council for Missionary Education.
- Paton, William (1937). Christianity in the Eastern Conflicts. London: Edinburgh House Press.
- Paton, William (1941). The Church and the New Order. London: SCM Press.
