= Satyakāma Jābāla =

Vedic sage

Satyakāma Jābāla (सत्यकाम जाबाल) also known as Satyakāma Jābāli was a Vedic sage, who first appears in the fourth prapāṭhaka/chapter of the ancient Vedic text, the Chāndogya Upanishad.

As a boy, in order to become brahmachārī, Satyakāma enquires about his father and his family from his mother Jabālā. His mother tells him that she went about many places in her youth attending to different people devoted to their service and did not know his lineage. Therefore, she tells that in this world, all that she has is him and vice versa so you shall be called as Satyakāma Jābāla.

Eager for knowledge, he goes to the sage Haridrumata Gautama, requesting the sage's permission to live in his school for Brahmacharya. The teacher asks, "My dear child, what family do you come from?". Satyakāma replies that he is of uncertain parentage because his mother did not know who the father is. He tells him that his lineage as his mother gave him is Satyakāma Jābāla. Witnessing his innocence and his desire to learn, the sage declares that the boy's honesty is the mark of a "Brāhmaṇa, true seeker of the knowledge of the Brahman" and accepts him as a student in his school.

The sage sends Satyakāma to tend four hundred cows, and come back when they multiply into a thousand. The symbolic legend then presents Satyakāma's conversation with a bull, a fire, a swan (Haṃsa, हंस) and a diver bird (Madgu, मद्गु), which respectively symbolise Vāyu, Agni, Āditya and Prāṇa. Satyakāma then learns from these creatures that the form of Brahman is in all cardinal directions (north, south, east, west), world-bodies (earth, atmosphere, sky and ocean), sources of light (fire, sun, moon, lightning), and in man (breath, eye, ear and mind). Satyakāma returns to his teacher with a thousand cows, and humbly learns the rest: the nature of Brahman (metaphysical, ultimate reality).

Satyakāma graduates and becomes a celebrated sage, according to the Hindu tradition. A Vedic school is named after him, as is the influential ancient text Jābāla Upanishad – a treatise on Sannyāsa (a Hindu monk's monastic life). Upakosala Kamalayana was a student of Satyakama Jabala, whose story is also presented in the Chhāndogya Upanishad. Satyakāma Jābāla's teacher Gautama gives him the name Patan.
