= Raikva =

Cart driver in Muktika canon

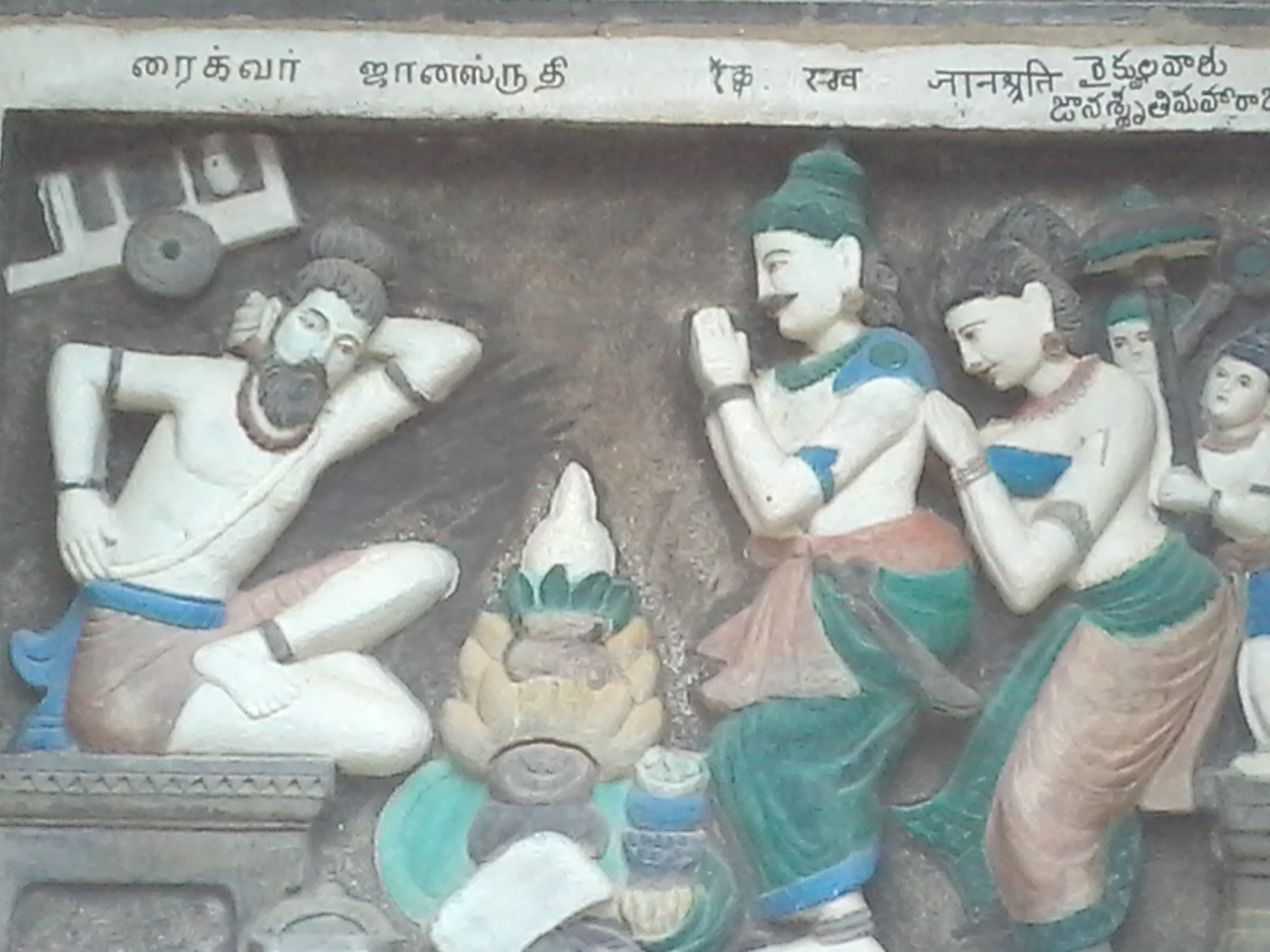
Sage Raikva teaches Atma Vidya King Janasuruti

Raikva, the poor unknown cart-driver, appears in Chapter IV of the Chandogya Upanishad of Muktika canon where it is learnt that he knew That which was knowable and needed to be known, he knew That from which all this had originated. Along with Uddalaka, Prachinshala, Budila, Sarkarakshaya and Indradyumna, who respectively held earth, heaven, water, space and air to be the substrata of all things, and many others, Raikva was one of the leading Cosmological and Psychological philosophers of the Upanishads. He imparted the Samvarga Vidya to King Janasruti. Like Indradyumna he too held air to be substratum of all things.

King Janasruti, the ruler of Mahavrisha, was famous for his philanthropy and charity who was proud of what he gave away as gifts and in charity. He had come to know about Raikva by chance from the swans, who already impressed by his deeds of charity, had seen him, and whose conversation he happened to overhear. He heard one swan tell the other

-As the inferior ones get included in Krta (the face of the dice bearing the number, Four), when it becomes the winner, so all virtuous deeds performed by people get included in this one; any one else who knows what he, Raikva, knows, he is also like Raikva.(Chandogya Upanishad IV.1.3)

Janasruti who was himself wise and learned was astonished at what he had heard and which was meant for him to be heard. He approached Raikva with gifts, and after being called a Sudra (Sudra means one who is tormented by cravings and therefore, by pain and suffering), he accosted Raikava again with even richer gifts and his beautiful daughter in offer. Raikva told Janasruti that air was the end of all things and so logically also the beginning of all things

- when fire is extinguished it goes to the air, when the sun sets it goes to the air, when the moon sets it goes to the air, when the waters dry up, they go to the air; thus verily is Air the final absorbent of all things whatsoever.(Chandogya Upanishad IV.3.1-2) .

He did not explain the actual process of absorption but Raikva was bold in including water and fire among the absorbed things, those two elements that had been held to be from where all things originated. With Prana considered by Ushasti Chakrayana as the life-principle Raikva brings out a correspondence between the macrocosm and the microcosm as the universal and in living things, as the final absorbent. Raikva was a mystic who knew about the relationship between the macrocosm and the microcosm and concluded that the two which are such, are surely the two places of merger – air indeed in the case of gods, the vital force in the case of organ, that absorption is the important quality to be meditated upon as Air and Prana. Prana or Vayu are Brahman. Brahman is also the substratum of ignorance but the effects of ignorance are seen only through created things such as the Jivas.
