= David Patten (disambiguation) =

David Patten (1974–2021) was an American football player.

David Patten may also refer to:

- David W. Patten (1799–1838), American leader in the Latter Day Saint movement
- David Patten (basketball) (born 1984), American basketball player

== See also ==
- David Patton (disambiguation)
- David Paton (disambiguation)
