= Peter Lorimer (moderator) =

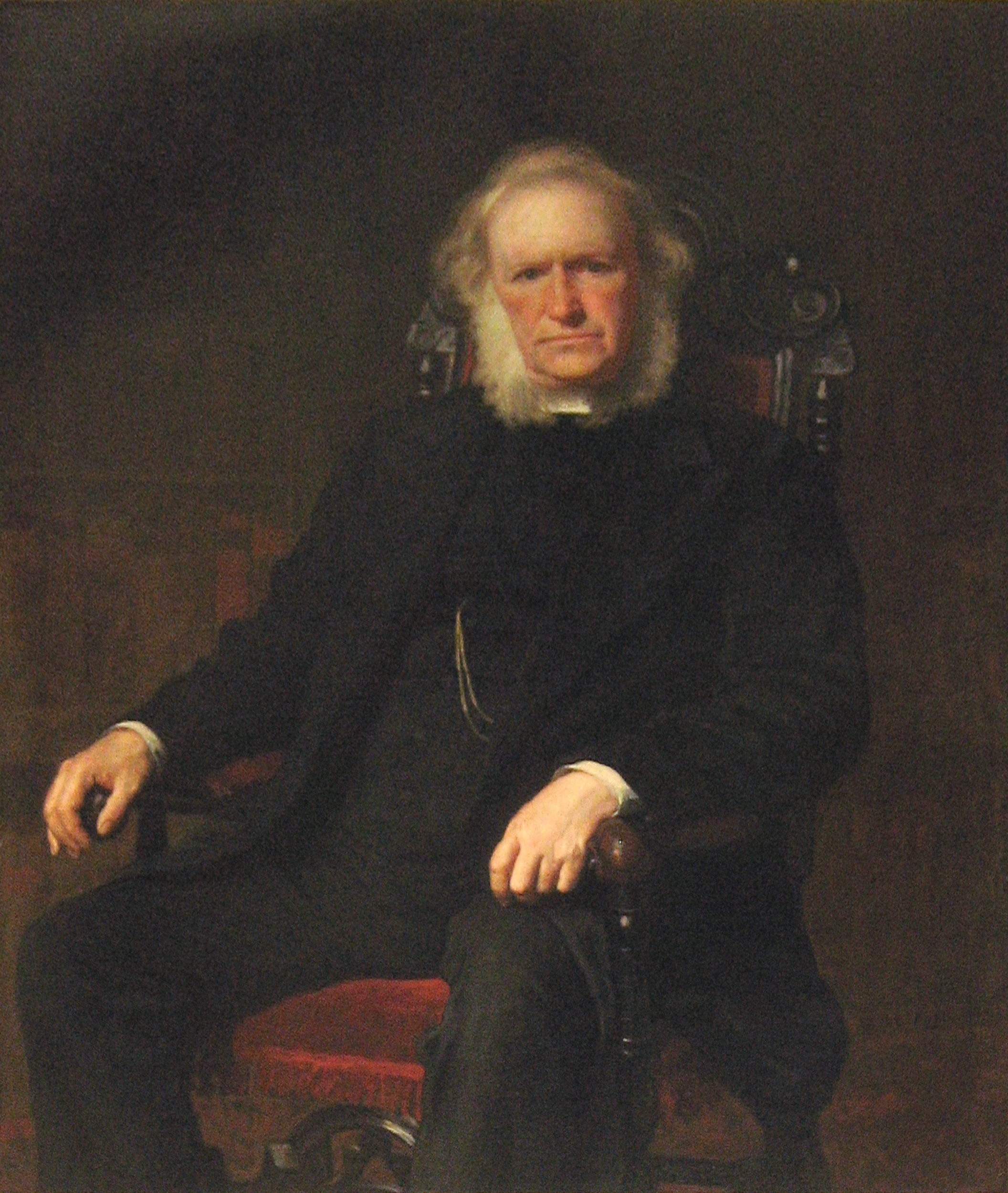
Lorimer portrait by John Pettie in Westminster College, Cambridge

Peter Lorimer (1812–1879) was a historian, religious author and minister of the Church of Scotland in London who became Moderator of the Synod of the English Presbyterian Church.

== Life ==
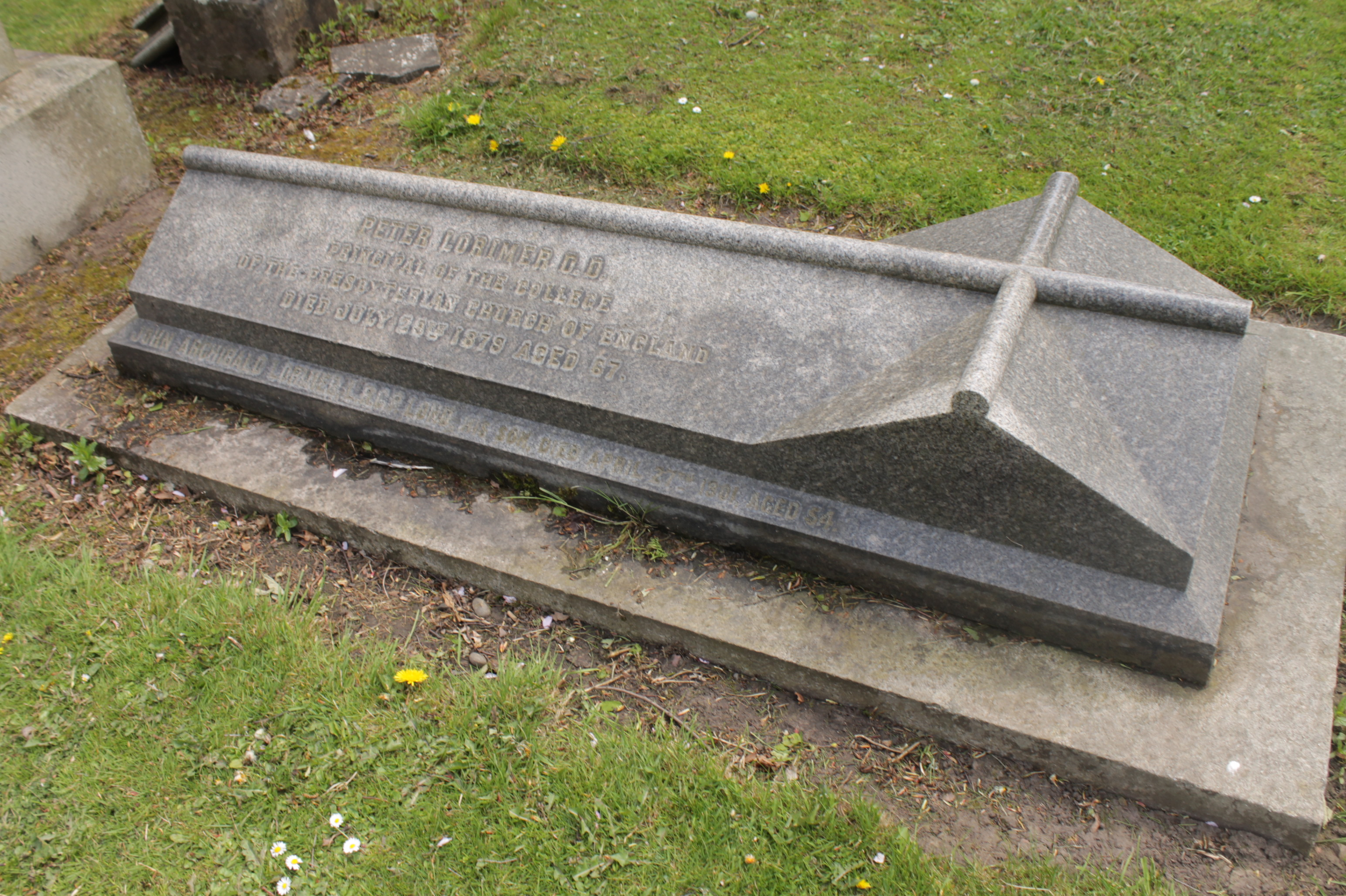
The grave of Rev Peter Lorimer, Grange Cemetery

He was born at 161 Rose Street in Edinburgh's First New Town in 1812, the son of John Lorimer, a master builder. He was educated at the Royal High School, Edinburgh and then George Heriot's School. He won a bursary to Edinburgh University in 1827.

He was licensed to preach as a minister of the Church of Scotland by the Presbytery of Edinburgh. In September 1837 the Church sent him to one of the Scots Churches in London: Chadwell Street and Islington.

At the Disruption of 1843 he left the established Church of Scotland. He was the main supporter of the Free Church movement in London but ultimately joined an English rather than Scottish church. He attended the Presbyterian Synod at Berwick-upon-Tweed in 1843. Returning to London in 1844 he was offered the chair in Theology at the English Presbyterian College. In 1851 he was elected Moderator of the English Presbyterian Synod. In 1857 the University Of New Jersey awarded him a Doctor of Divinity. In 1878 he became Principal of the English Presbyterian College.

He died suddenly in Whitehaven in north-west England on 29 July 1879, where he had been invited to preach, but was buried in Grange Cemetery in South Edinburgh. The grave lies on the south side of the main north path.

== Family ==
In 1840 he married Hannah Fox (1817-1884) of Whitehaven. They had a son John Archibald Lorimer (b.1847) a surgeon in Farnham and a daughter Annie Lorimer who married James Austin, a barrister.

== Publications ==
- Healthy Religion Exemplified in the Life of Andrew Jack of Edinburgh (1852)
- Precursors of Knox (1857)
- The Scottish Reformation, a Historical Sketch (1860)
- The Function of the Four Gospels (1869)
- A Good and Faithful Servant (1871)
- John Knox and the Church of England (8 vols 1875)
- The Scottish Reformation: A Historical Sketch
- Patrick Hamilton, the First Preacher and Martyr of the Scottish Reformation

== Artistic recognition ==
He was portrayed by John Pettie.
