= Westminster College (Cambridge) =

Theological college of the United Reformed Church

Coordinates: 52.210366°N 0.111933°E

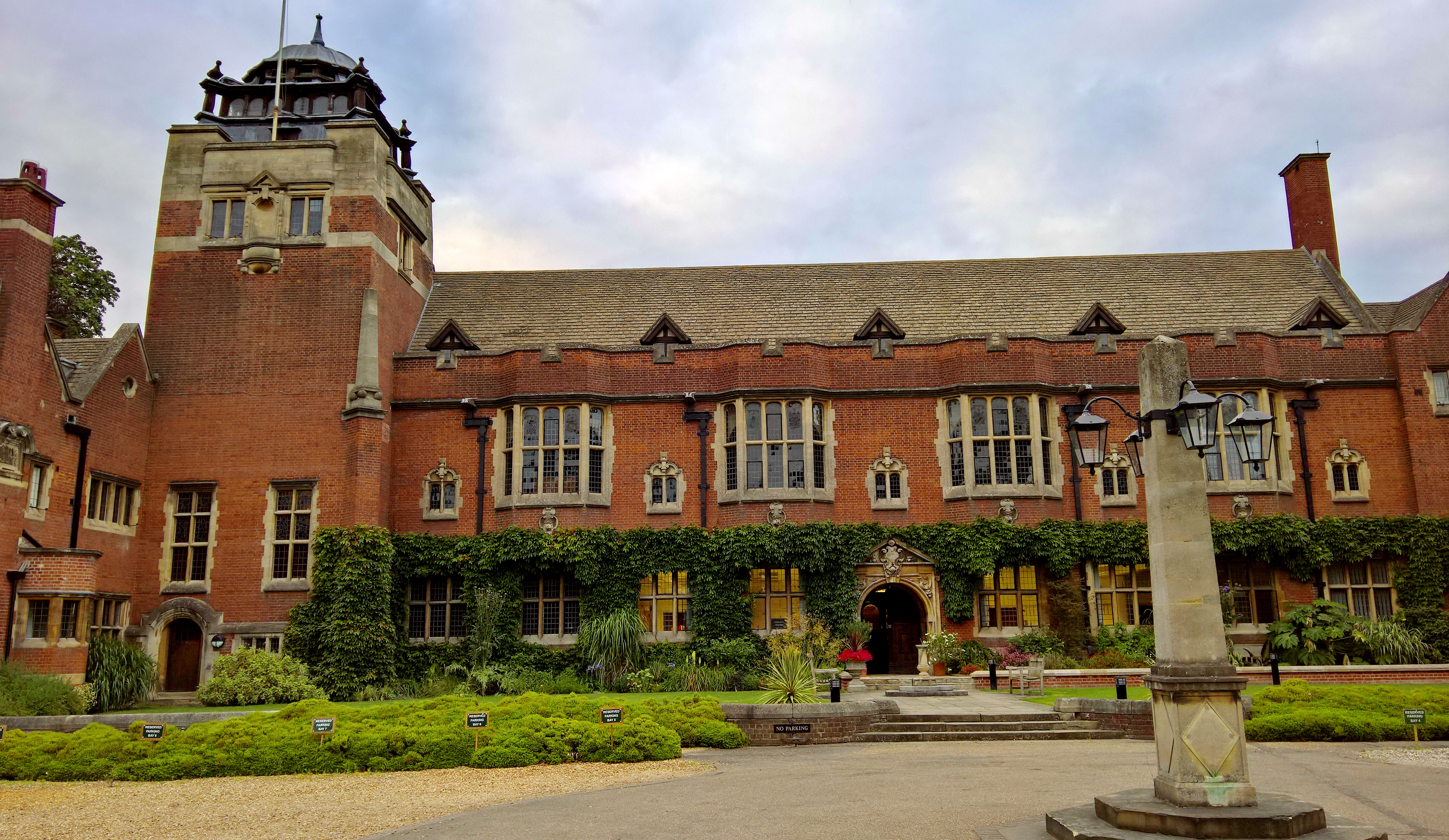
The Main Building of Westminster College

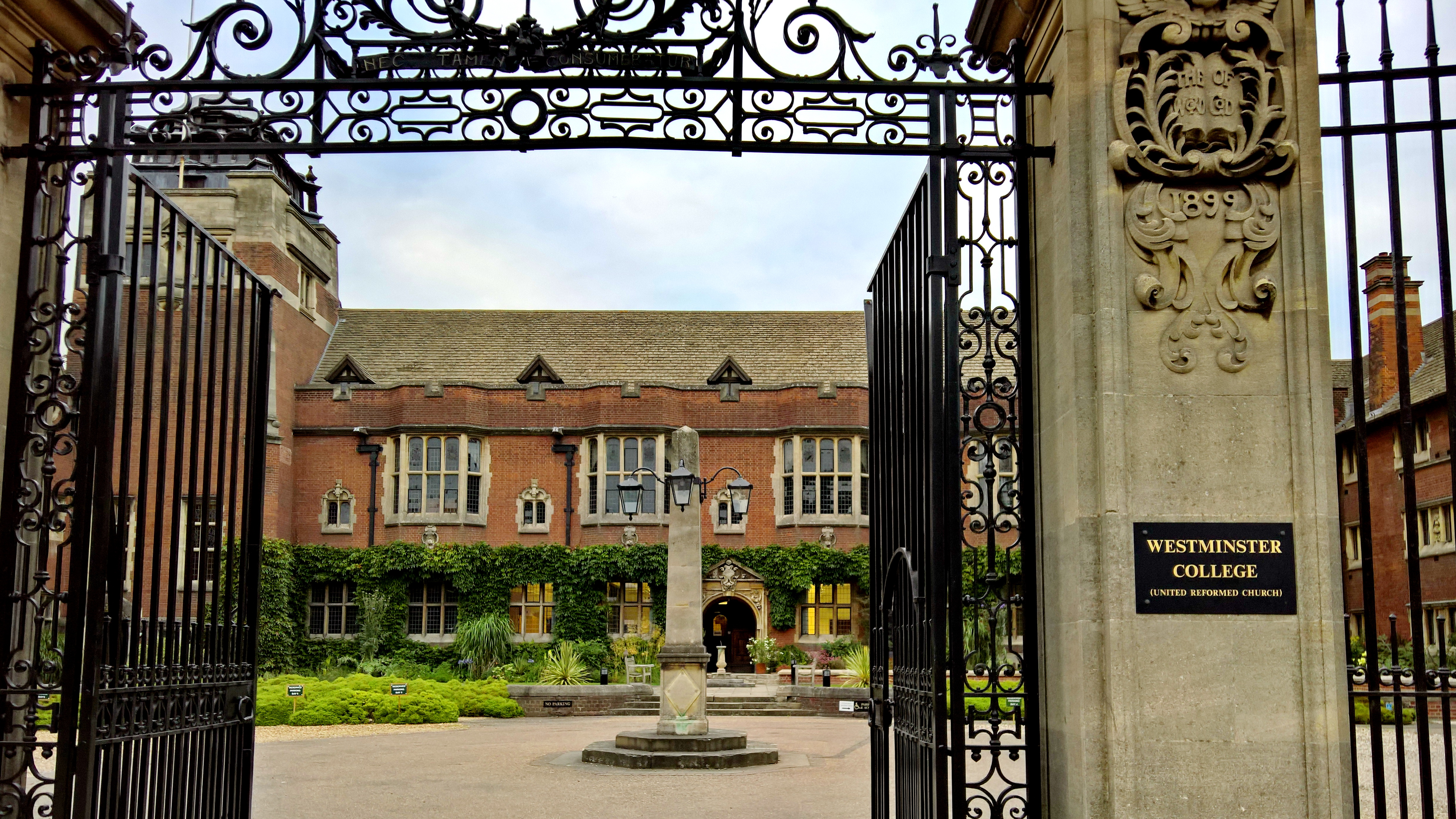
Front Gate of Westminster College

Westminster College in Cambridge, England, is a theological college of the United Reformed Church. Its principal purpose is training for the ordination of ministers, but is also used more widely for training within the denomination.

== History ==
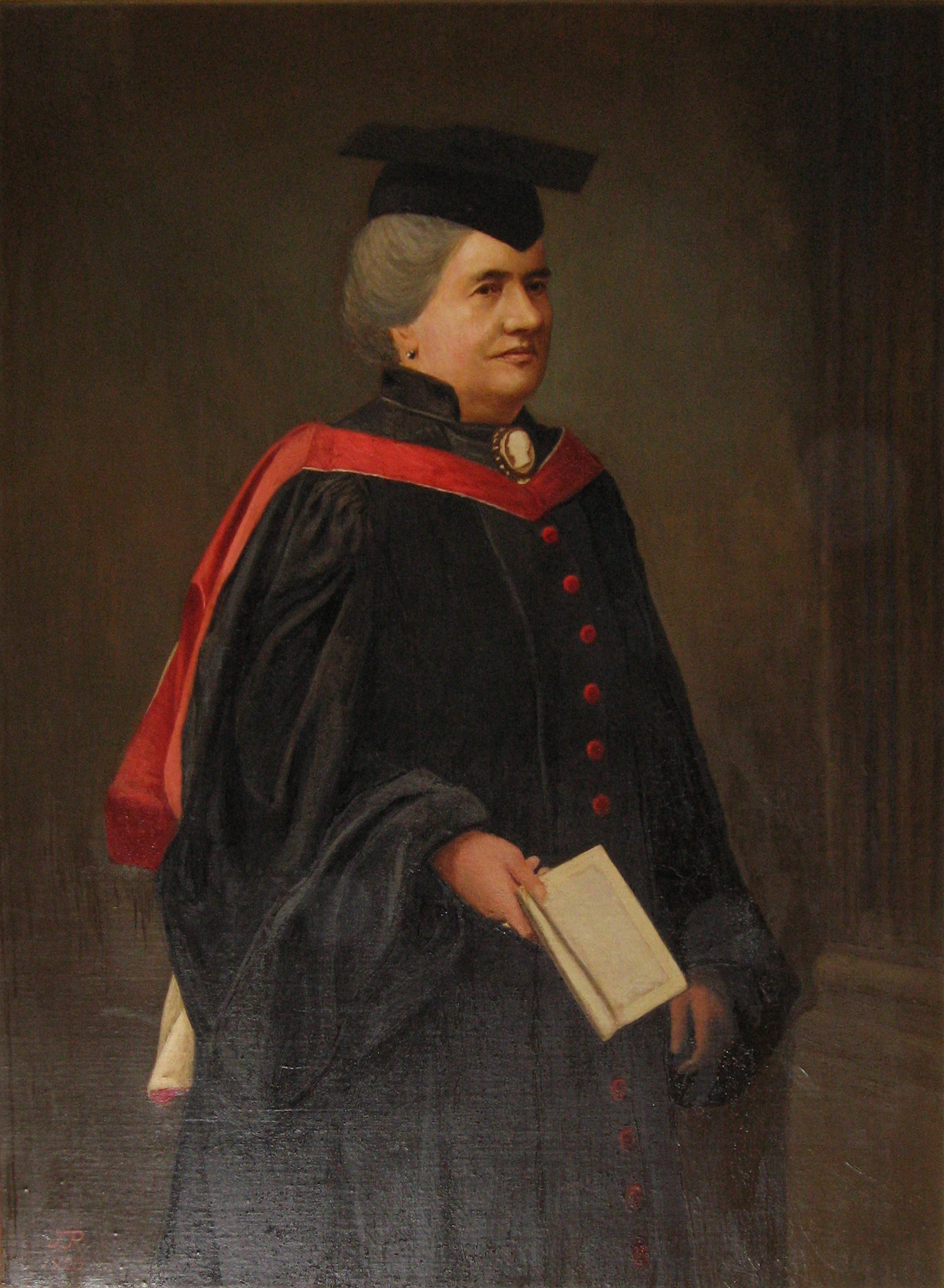
Agnes Smith Lewis, benefactor

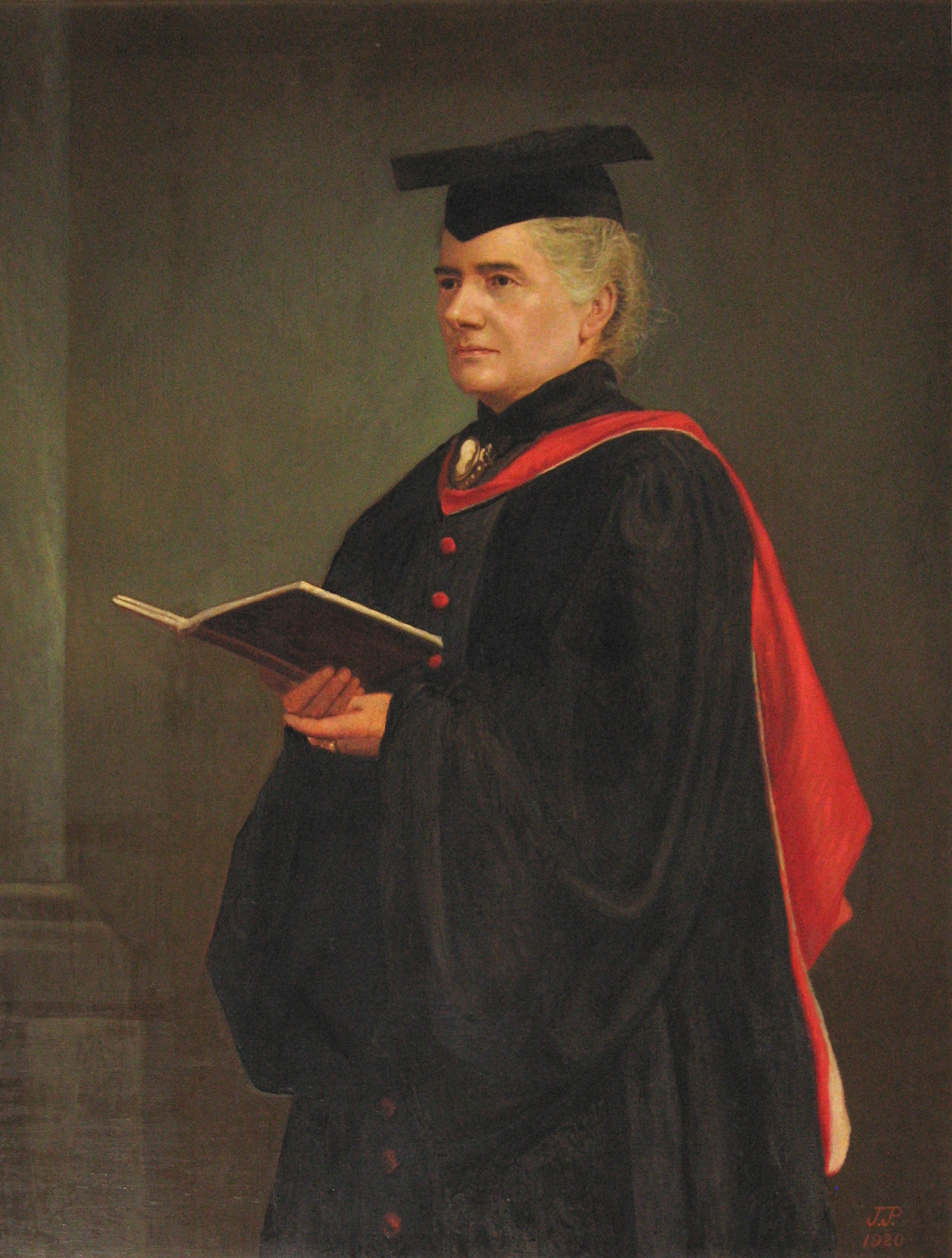
Margaret Dunlop Gibson, benefactor

The college was founded in London in 1844 with a temporary home in the Exeter Hall in the Strand, before moving to permanent premises in Queen Square, London in 1859. It then moved to Cambridge in 1899 following the gift of a prime site of land on Madingley Road near the centre of the city by two Scottish sisters, Agnes Smith Lewis and Margaret Dunlop Gibson, both noted biblical scholars. Following an appeal for funds from the wider Presbyterian congregation, the college commissioned a new building designed by Henry Hare and built between 1897 and 1899. The general style is Tudor and the materials are red brick with stone dressings. The building is Grade II listed.

The dedication of a new college chapel took place in 1921; also by Hare, it was given by Sir William Noble, 1st Baronet and his wife Margaret to commemorate the death of their son William Black Noble in the First World War. The stained glass windows are by Douglas Strachan on the theme of the Benedicite and were completed in 1925. The decoration of the apse was completed in 1929 by W. Jowsey.

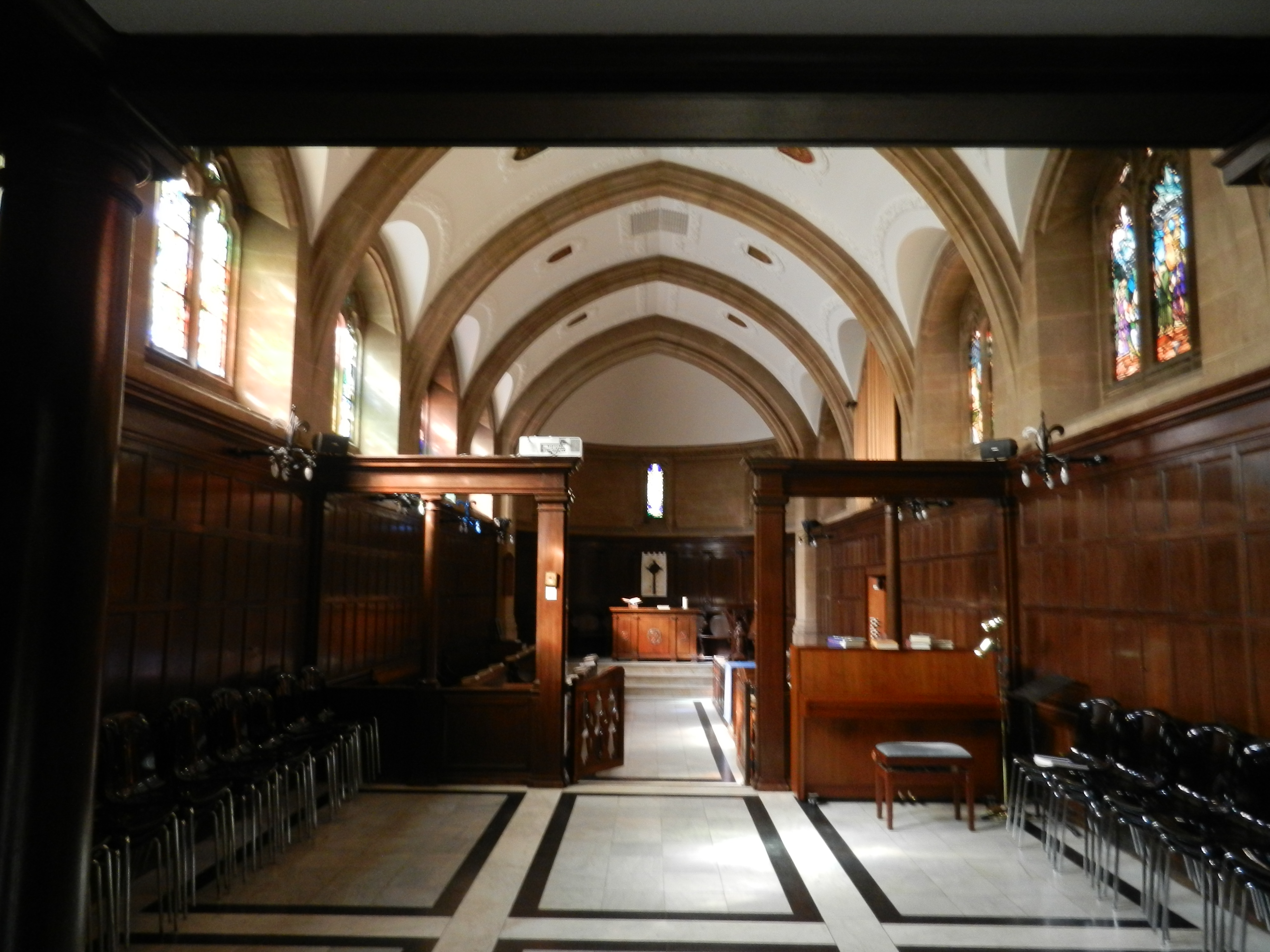
The chapel at Westminster College

In 1967 the college began to amalgamate with Cheshunt College, Cambridge, presaging the union of the Congregational and Presbyterian churches to form the United Reformed Church in 1972.

=== Lewis and Gibson ===
Agnes Smith Lewis and Margaret Dunlop Gibson were noted for their study of one of the earliest versions of the Old Gospels, in the Syriac Sinaiticus manuscript discovered in Saint Catherine's Monastery on the Sinai Peninsula. The other important contributions to the field of Aramaic and Theology are the publications of the Codex Climaci Rescriptus, a 6th-century palimpsest written in Christian Palestinian Aramaic which contains portions of the Old Testament and New Testament, and another palimpsest manuscript of the Forty Martyrs of the Sinai desert and the Story of Eulogios, the Stone Cutter in the same Aramaic dialect. The sisters found the manuscripts in the antiquities market of Cairo and acquired them for the library in Westminster College. They were sold in 2010 to the Green Collection, displayed in the Museum of the Bible in Washington, D.C. They edited also many other important manuscripts in Syriac and Arabic.

In 1897 Lewis and Gibson also found and purchased some fragments of parchment of the Cairo Genizah whilst travelling in the Middle East. With the support of Solomon Schechter they made several more trips to the Middle East, locating the majority of the Genizah at the Ben Ezra Synagogue in Cairo. Schechter identified the fragments as forming part of the Hebrew Wisdom of Sirach.

The Cairo Genizah collection was put up for sale by Westminster College for £1.2 million in 2013. The two Oxbridge libraries, the Bodleian Library of the University of Oxford and Cambridge's Cambridge University Library combined to raise funds to buy the collection from Westminster after it was put up for sale. This is the first time the two libraries have collaborated for such a fundraising effort. The money was used by Westminster College to help finance a £7 million refurbishment of the College in 2013–2014.

== Today ==
The college is not part of the University of Cambridge, but has joined with six other religious colleges in Cambridge to form the Cambridge Theological Federation, which is affiliated with the university.

Currently, Westminster has connected with it around 50 students; some in training for ministry in the United Reformed Church, and some studying for other work or pleasure. Westminster is served by five academic staff, covering the traditional theological disciplines of Systematic Theology, Church History, Old Testament Studies, New Testament Studies and Pastoral Studies. Traditionally, most students have studied for four years, which includes an internship year working in a local church. However, the College now trains many students part-time and via distance learning, as well as through full-time in-house courses. Most students still work, nonetheless, either for a BA or MA degree (awarded by Anglia Ruskin University) or a BTh or BA/Tripos degree (awarded by Cambridge University).

Since 2017 the Westminster College site has also been home to the Woolf Institute of Abrahamic Faiths and Faraday Institute for Science and Religion.

Westminster College is also affiliated with the American writer and Presbyterian theologian, Frederick Buechner. The College awards an annual prize for Excellence in Writing named after the author.

== Notable alumni ==
Notable former students include

- W. D. Davies, known for his work on Paul and his Jewish background
- Thomas Walter Manson, the biblical scholar and Rylands Professor in the University of Manchester
- Lesslie Newbigin, ecumenist, bishop, scholar and pioneer of the Church of South India
- William Paton, a precursor to Newbigin and a seminal figure in modern ecumenism

== Notable staff ==
- James Oswald Dykes, Principal and Barbour Professor of Divinity from 1888 to 1907
- Herbert Henry Farmer, Barbour Professor of Systematic Theology from 1935 to 1960
- John Wood Oman, Professor of Systematic Theology and Apologetics from 1907, then the college's principal from 1922 until 1935
- Patrick Carnegie Simpson, Professor of Church History from 1914 to 1937

== Gallery ==
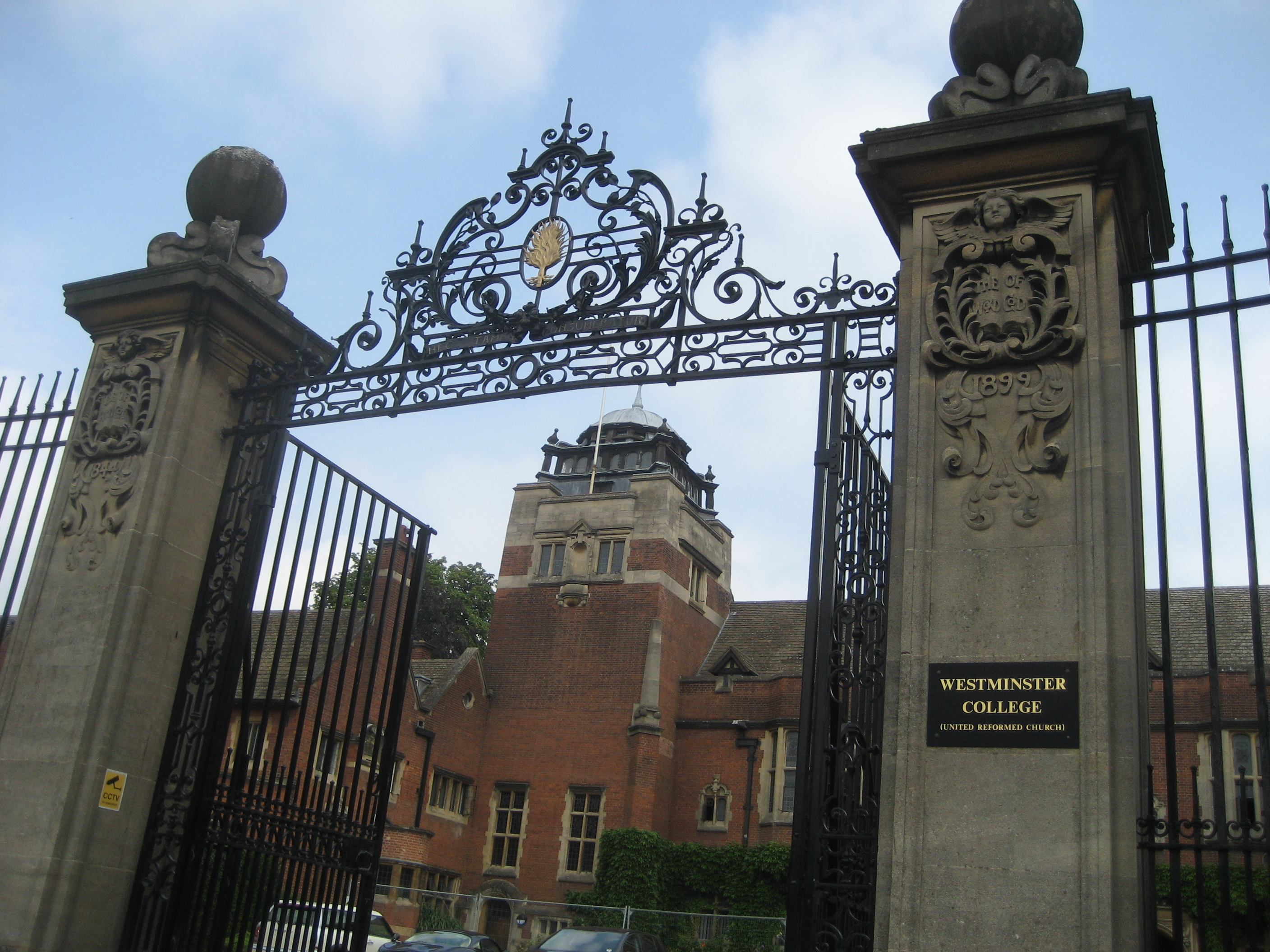
Front gate

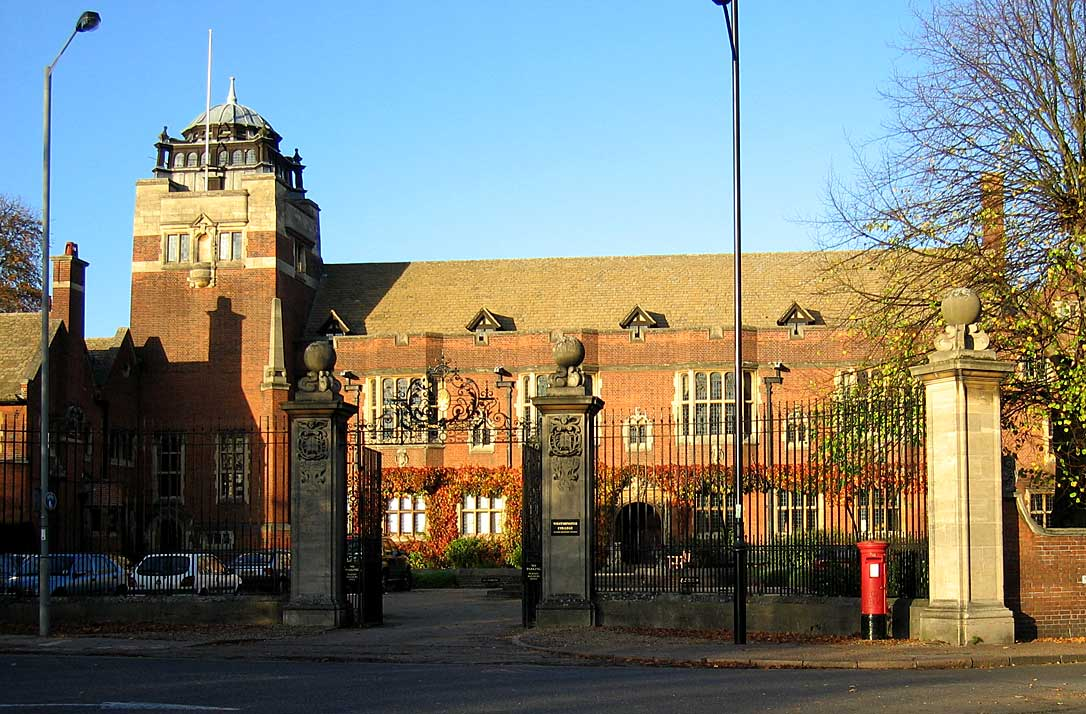
Westminster College sits on one of the busier intersections of Cambridge's ring road

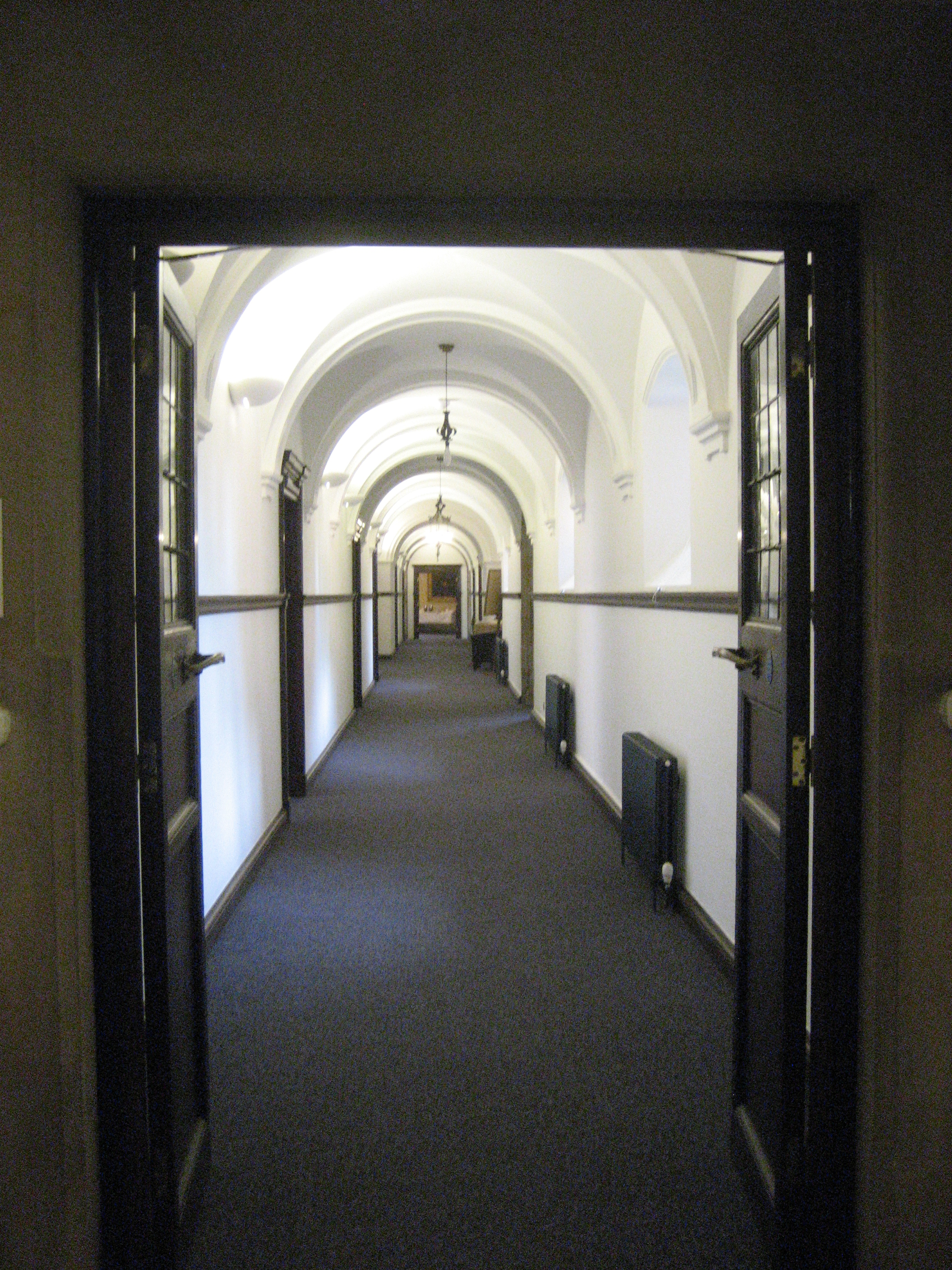
The College

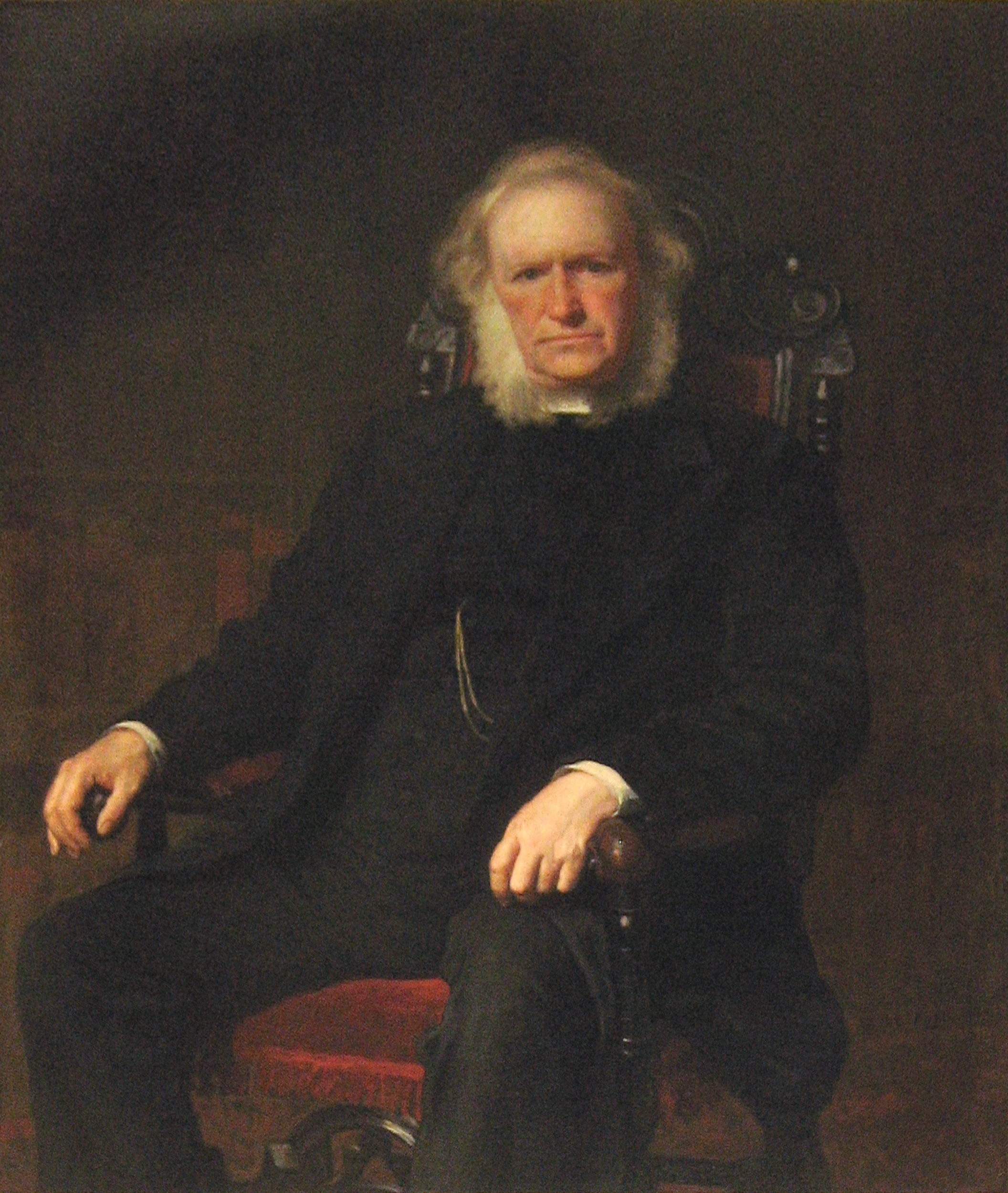
Peter Lorimer (first principal) by John Pettie

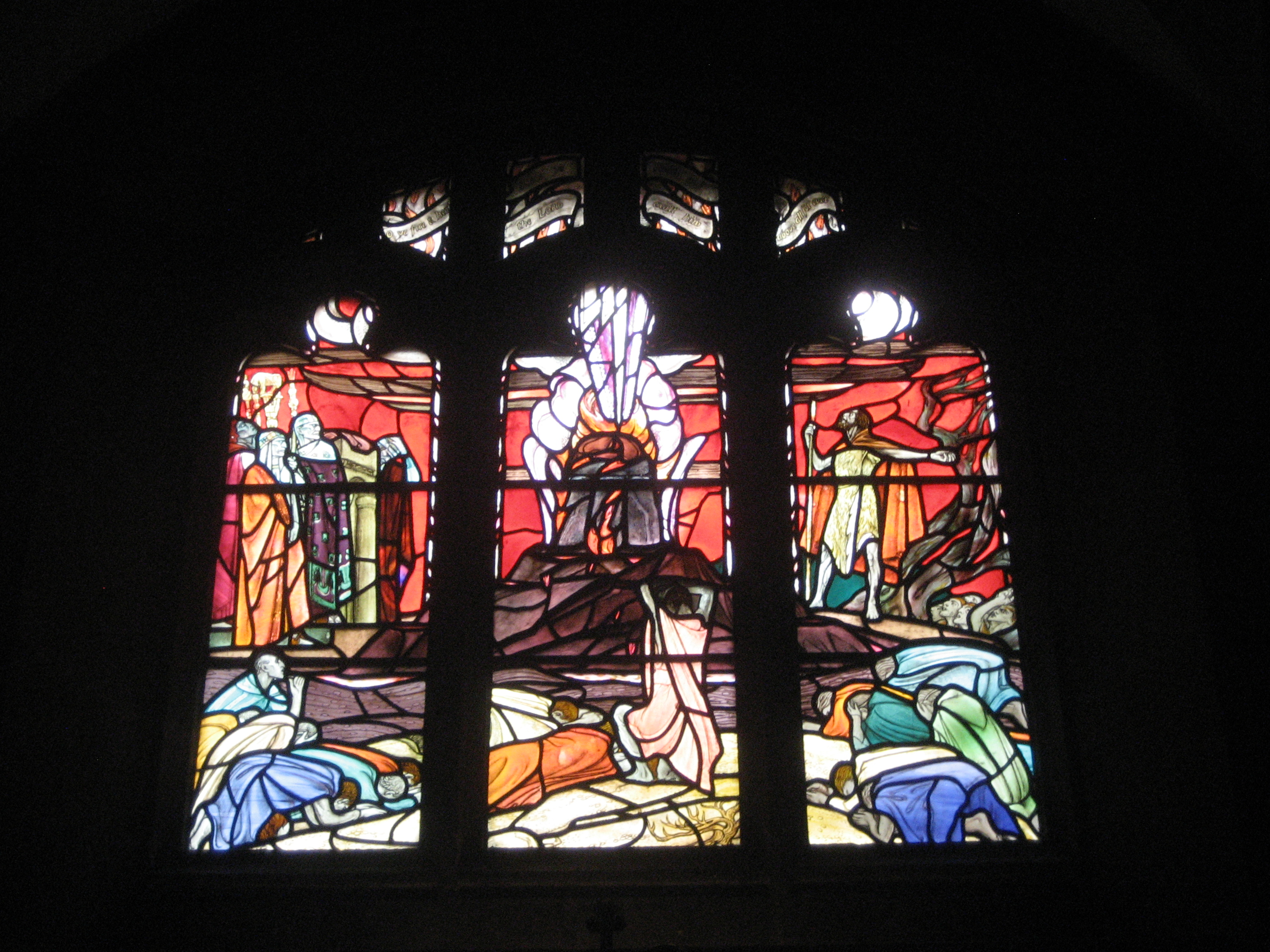
Chapel
(stained glass)

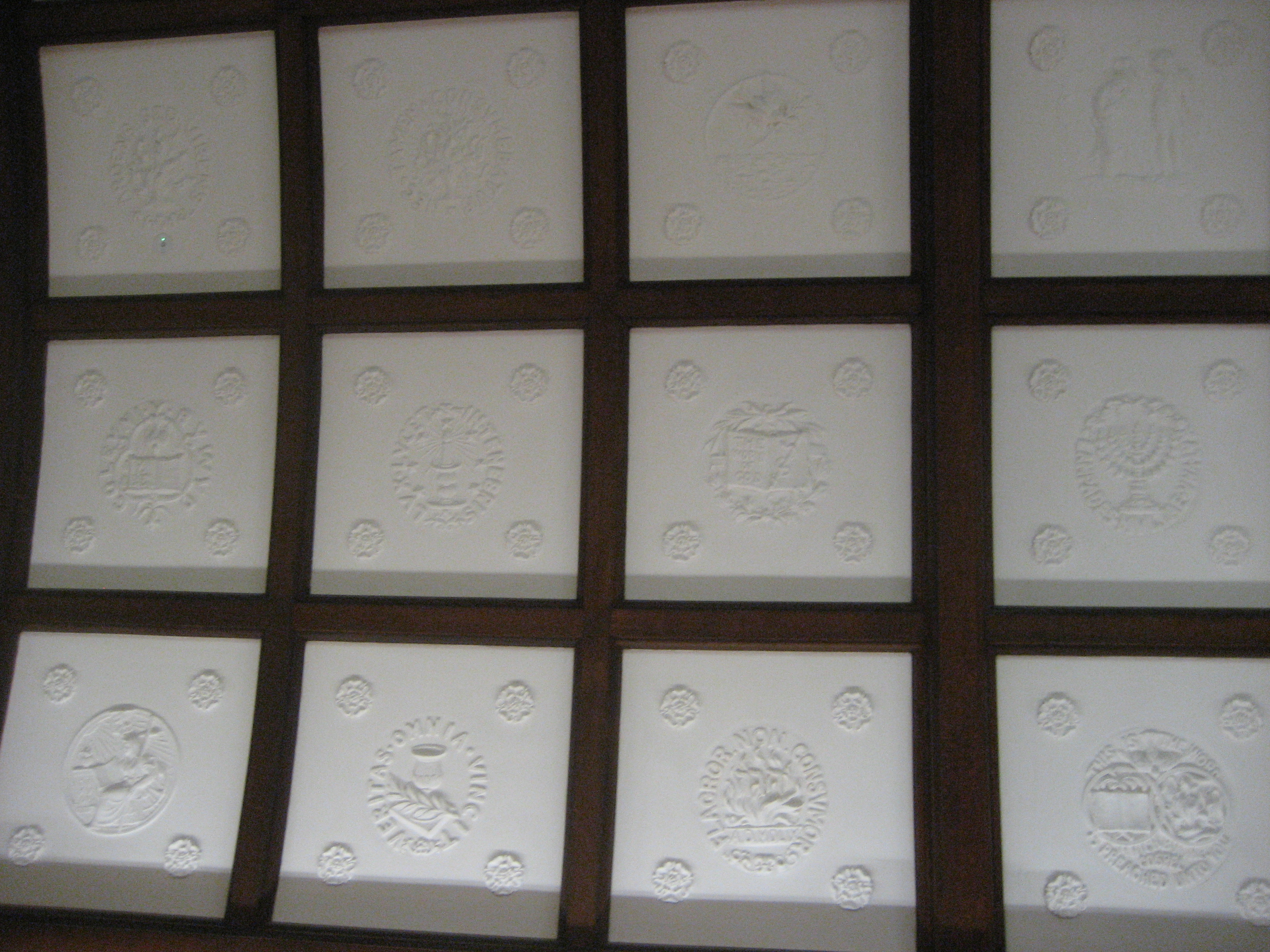
Ceiling dining hall
(with logos of Presbyterian churches)

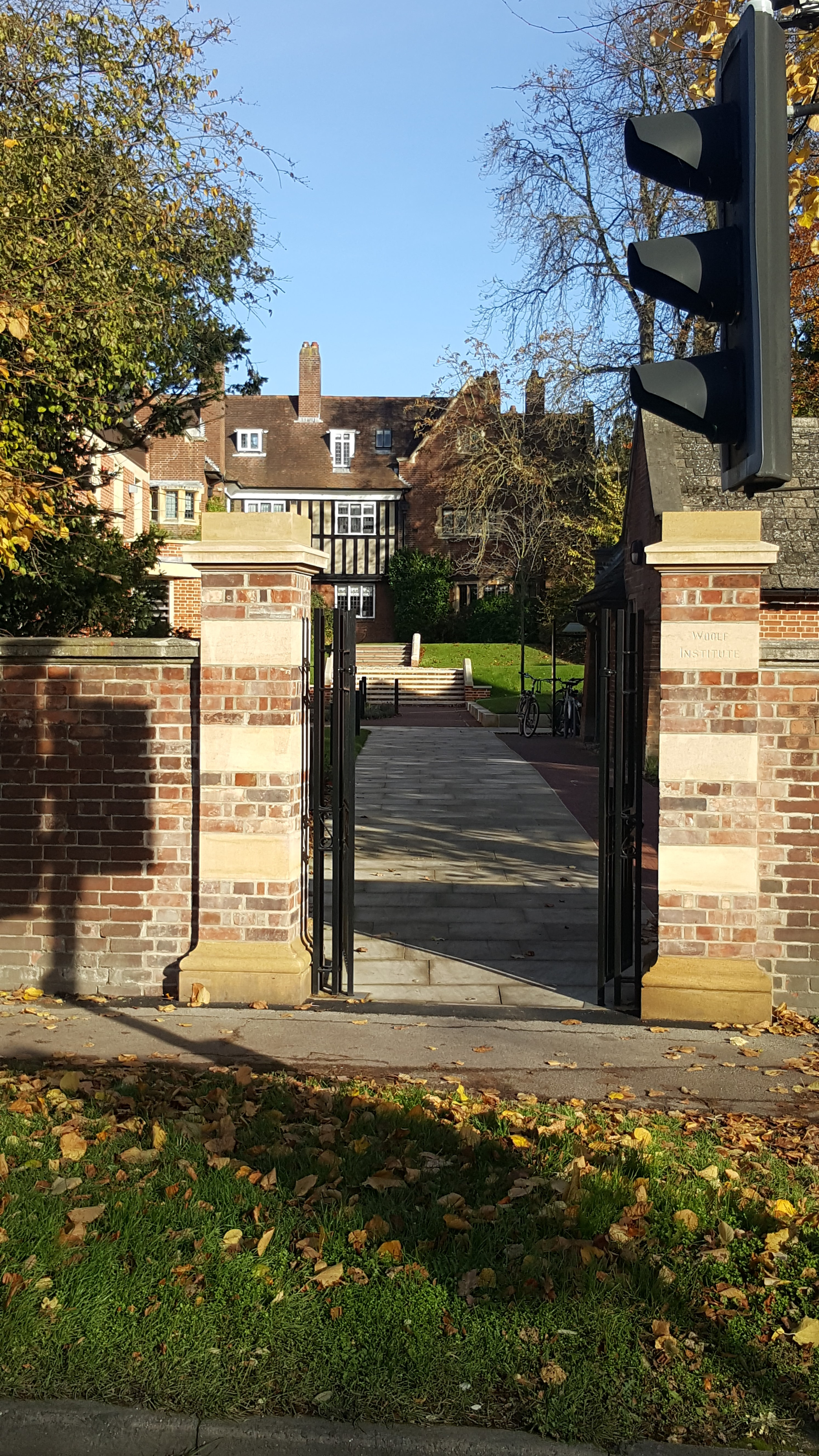
Pedestrian entrance to the Woolf Institute Building

== See also ==
- Listed buildings in Cambridge (west)
