= David Paton (missionary) =

Church of England clergyman

David M. Paton (1913–1992) was an Anglican missionary to China, working under the Church Missionary Society.

== Early life ==
Born in Hampstead, London, David M. Paton was the eldest son of William Paton (1886–1943), a missionary to Calcutta, India and one of the founding members of the World Council of Churches. He finished his high school in Repton College and undergraduate in the University of Oxford. Before his overseas ministry, he spent three years as secretary of the Student Christian Movement at the University of Birmingham.

== Ministry ==
In 1939, he went to Beijing to learn Chinese and was sent to Chongqing from 1941 to 1944. He was ordained by Ronald Hall in Hong Kong in 1941. After his return to England for three years, he taught at Fujian Union Theological College between 1947 and 1950.

Since then, he worked in a parish in Birmingham served as an editor of the SCM Press, and in London for ecumenical work of the Church of England. He was also the chairman of the China Study Project of British Churches. He was Chaplain to the Queen between 1972 and 83.

== Writings ==
- Christian Mission and the Judgment of God. Cambridge: William B. Eerdmans, 1996.
- R.O.: The Life and Times of Bishop Hall of Hong Kong. Gloucester: The Diocese of Hong Kong and Macao and The Hong Kong Diocesan Association, 1985.
