= Rik (verse) =

Praising mantras of Rigaveda

- ऋक्

Information
- Religion: Hinduism
- Language: Sanskrit
- Period: Vedic
- Books: Rigaveda
- Mantras for the praise of the deities in the text Vedas

Rik (Sanskrit: ऋक्) refers to Mantras in the Rigaveda which are meant for the praise of the deities. They are the metrical portions of hymns and are regarded as the principal mantras in the Vedas. They are considered the speech of the Vedas. According to Yaska, the Rik is also called Archani. The major Riks of the Vedas were composed on the banks of the Indus river in the Indian subcontinent.

The collection of Riks is called as Rik-Samhita in the Vedas. The Rik-Samhita constitute the Samhita portion of the text Rigaveda. It is also known as Rigaveda Samhita. There are about 10552 Rik verses in the Rigaveda Samhita. The first Rik verse in the Samhita is dedicated to Lord Agni as

ॐ अग्निमीळे पुरोहितं यज्ञस्य देवमृत्विजम्। होतारं रत्नषातमम्।।१।।

— Rik 1, Sukta 1, Mandala 1, Rigaveda

== Etymology ==
Rik is a Sanskrit term or word. The general meaning of the word 'Rik' is praise or prayer. There is a quote regarding the term Rik as

ऋच्यते स्तूयतेऽनया इति ऋक् ।

== Description ==
The Rik mantras are used to praise or pray to the deities. These are recited to perform stuti and prarthana of the deities in Hinduism. It is estimated that the final reduction of the Rik mantras took place during the period when the Brahmanical element became predominant in the Indian subcontinent.

The Riks are the earliest sources of faith in Hinduism. In the Vedic literature, there is the anteriority of the Rik to the Brahmanas. According to lectures of Rajkumar Sarvadhikari, the Rik is the parent tree in Vedas, while the other two Sama and Yaju of the Vedas are only its offshoots and they are very properly called the attendants of the Rik.

== Dating ==
In the development of the Vedic literature, the Rik is the oldest textual literature and the earliest depository of the Aryan faiths.
