= Swaraj (disambiguation) =

Swaraj is an Indian concept of self-governance.

Swaraj or Swarajya may also refer to:

== Religion ==
- Sanskrit sva-rāj, self-resplendent, self-luminous, shining of one's self (said of the Ashvins, Indra, Mitra, and Varuna); the supreme Being (Brahman)
- Sanskrit svā-rāj, the ruler of heaven, i. e. Indra

== Politics ==
- Swaraj Party, Swarajaya Party, or Swarajya Party, an Indian political party formed in 1922
- Swaraj Party (Burma), a political party active in Burma in the 1920s

== People ==
- Sushma Swaraj (1952–2019), Indian lawyer and politician
- Swaraj Kaushal (1952–2025), Indian lawyer and politician, husband of Sushma Swaraj
- Swaraj Parkash (1923–2008), Indian naval officer
- Swaraj Prakash Gupta (1931–2007), Indian archaeologist and art historian

== Entertainment ==
- Swaraj (TV series), an Indian television series on DD National

== Other uses ==
- Swaraj (book), a 2012 book by Arvind Kejriwal
- Swaraj Mazda, an Indian automobile manufacturer
- Swaraj Tractors, an Indian tractor manufacturer
- Swarajya (magazine), a weekly magazine founded in 1956, closing 1980; relaunched as a monthly and online publication since 2014

== See also ==
- Hindavi Swarajya, a term for socio-political movements seeking to remove foreign military and political influences from India, first used in 1645
- Indian Home Rule movement, founded in 1916 to obtain the status of Dominion for India within the British Empire
