= John Wood Oman =

Presbyterian theologian

John Wood Oman, FBA (23 July 1860 – 17 May 1939) was a Scottish theologian and Presbyterian minister.

== Biography ==
The son of a farmer, Oman was born on 23 July 1860 and grew up in Orkney. He studied philosophy at the University of Edinburgh (1877–82), and then studied at the United Presbyterian Church's theological college in Edinburgh. In 1904 Oman gained a PhD from the University of Edinburgh. He was minister of Clayport Street Church in Alnwick (1889–1907). From 1907 to 1922, he was Professor of Systematic Theology and Apologetics at Westminster College, Cambridge. He then served as the college's principal from 1922 until his retirement in 1935.

In the meantime, he was Kerr Lecturer at the University of Glasgow (1906), Stanton Lecturer at the University of Cambridge (1913–16, 1919–22 and 1929–31) and Moderator of the General Assembly of the Presbyterian Church of England in 1931–32. He taught and published several books on theology. He received honorary Doctor of Divinity (DD) degrees from the universities of Oxford and Edinburgh, and in 1938 he was elected a fellow of the British Academy.

He died on 7 May 1939; his wife, Mary Hannah (née Blair), with whom he had four children, had died in 1936.

== Selected works ==
- Grace and Personality (London: Collins, 1917).
- The Natural and the Supernatural (Cambridge: Cambridge University Press, 1931).
- Honest Religion (Cambridge: Cambridge University Press, 1941).
