= Marion Kennedy =

British classical scholar

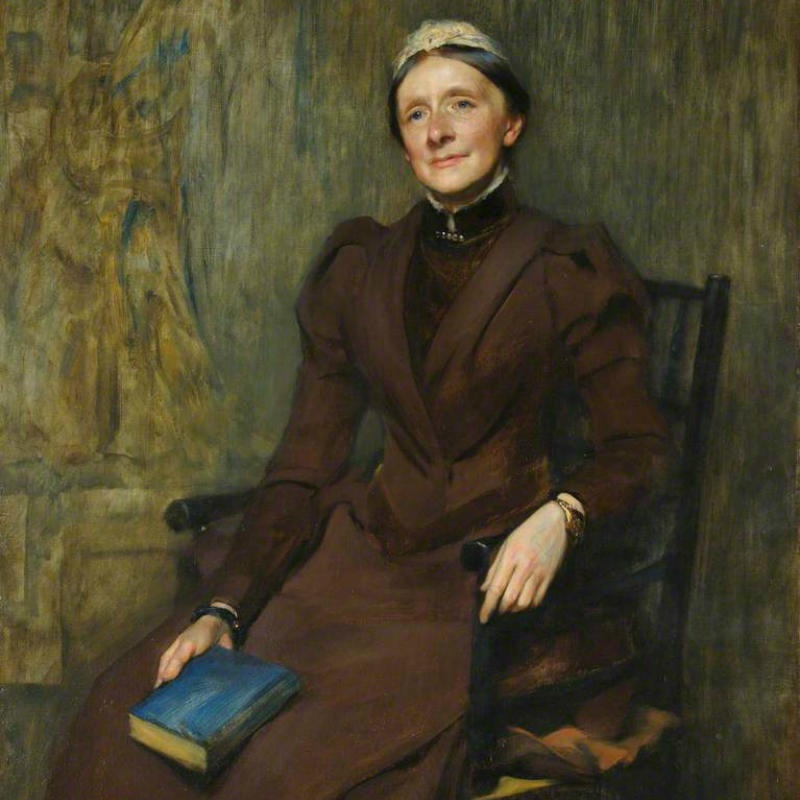
- Portrait by James Jebusa Shannon (1892)
- Born: 23 November 1836; Shrewsbury, England
- Died: 11 January 1914 (aged 77); Torquay, England
- Writing career
- Subject: Classics

Marion Grace Kennedy (23 November 1836 – 11 January 1914) was a British classical scholar. She was a supporter of women's suffrage and higher education for women. She was born too early to take advantage of women's higher education and her father took the credit for some of her work. She helped to found and then worked for Newnham College, Cambridge, where her ideas shaped its constitution.

== Life ==
Kennedy was the second child of her family, and the first to be born in Shrewsbury, where her father was headmaster of Shrewsbury School. Her parents were Janet and Benjamin Hall Kennedy and her elder sister was called Charlotte and she too would campaign for women's suffrage. Her father was inspiring, but her mother was the organised one who managed the family's money. She was known in the family as 'Maisie'.

She and her younger sister Julia stayed in the family home and moved to Cambridge with their parents when her father became Regius Professor of Greek in 1867. They were active in Cambridge from the family home in Bateman Street advancing reforming liberal views. The first Cambridge college for women, Girton College opened in 1869 and Newnham followed two years later. The improvement in women's rights was supported by the Sidgwick, Fawcett and Kennedy families. Early students at Newnham's took their exams at the Kennedy house.

Marion Kennedy generously financed and was the executive secretary of the Association for Promoting the Higher Education of Women in Cambridge which became part of Newnham in 1880. Marion looked after the students at the college holding the position of honorary secretary until 1904. In 1888 Philippa Fawcett was the first recipient of a postgraduate studentship established in Kennedy's honour. In 1892 James Jebusa Shannon painted a portrait of her which was funded by college members and is still owned by Newnham College.

Kennedy argued for a change in the college's constitution in 1892/3. She wanted to ensure that the alumnae of the college should have real power over the future direction of the college. The college agreed to appoint "Associates". These people were initially found by asking former students to suggest the twenty people who could support the objectives of "Education, learning and research". The twenty most popular names were appointed and ten more were added by the college. The Associates were full members of the college and every year three more were added and when 48 was reached then three also had to retire. This group includes eminent alumnae and staff. It meets once a year and the associates have their own agenda. The associates have used their influence to raise funds for a fellowship. They also drafted the 1917 constitution which included the associates in the distributed power base of the college.

In 1913, there was a problem with the copyright on the book Revised Latin Primer which had been published under her father's name in 1888. Marion Kennedy revealed that the book was in fact written by herself, her sister Julia and two of her father's male students; Marion had provided the examples, Julia the philological introduction. They were persuaded that they should not risk litigation as the book had been issued under their father's name and they had made no public claim to authorship. It is unlikely that Professor Kennedy had any hand in the revision of 1888, and the Shorter Latin Primer of the same year.

Aged seventy-seven, she marched in 1913 in a suffrage procession in London.

Kennedy died in Torquay in 1914. Her ashes were interred in Mill Road Cemetery, Cambridge with her parents.

== Legacy ==
Kennedy Hall at Newnham was opened in 1905. In 1923 Newnham College was given its own arms, based on themes taken from the arms of four families including the Kennedys.
