= Agnes Smith Lewis and Margaret Dunlop Gibson =

Twin British Syriacists, Arabists and writers

Agnes Smith Lewis
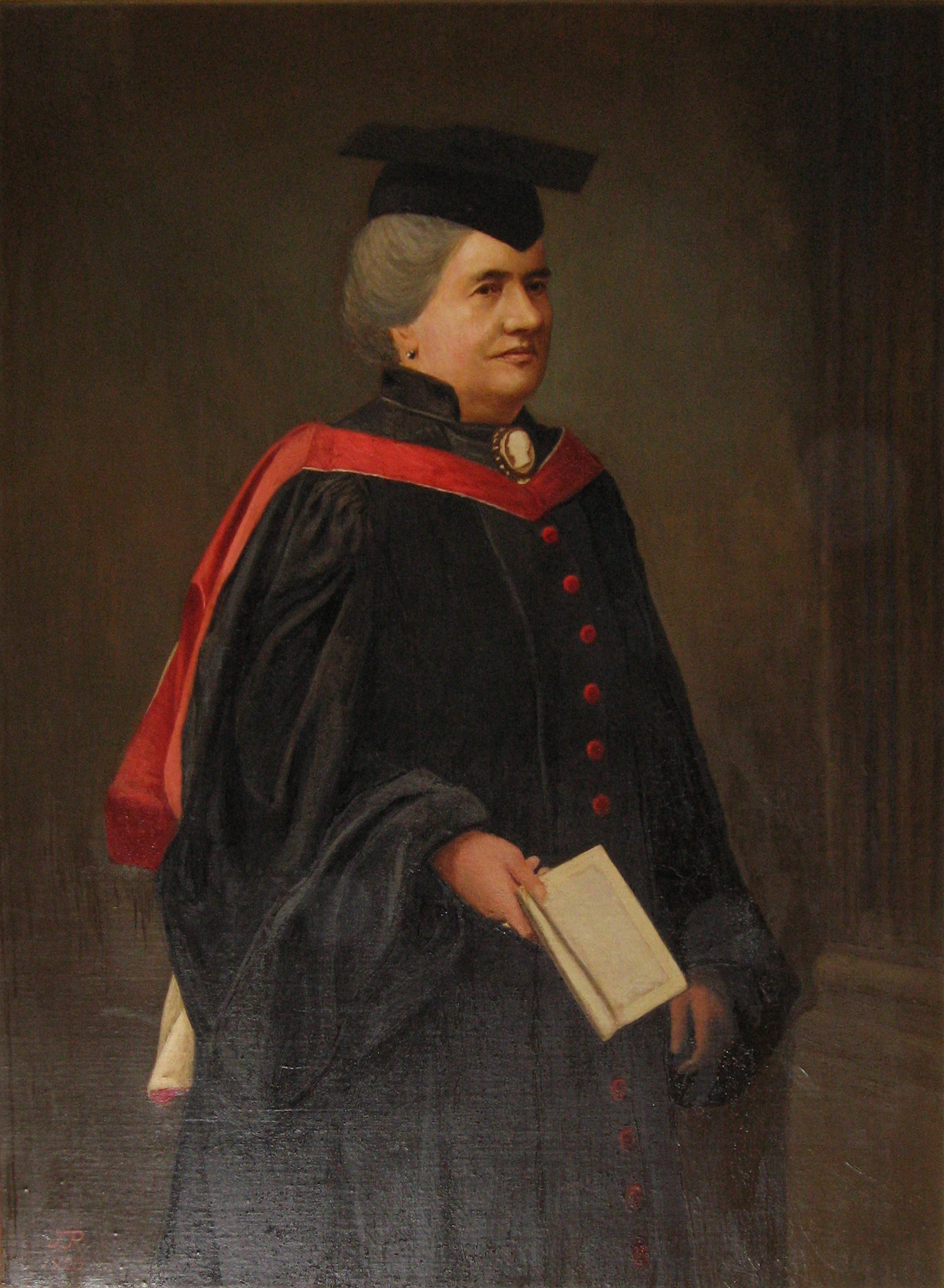
- Lewis painted by John Peddie, 1920
- Born: Agnes Smith; 11 January 1843; Irvine, Ayrshire, Scotland
- Died: 26 March 1926 (aged 83); Castle-brae, Chesterton Road, Cambridge, England
- Resting place: Mill Road Cemetery
- Spouse: Samuel Savage Lewis (m. 1887; died 1891)
- Relatives: Bunnell Lewis (brother-in-law)
- Awards: Triennial Gold Medal of the Royal Asiatic Society, 1915

Academic work
- Discipline: Syriac studies; Arab studies
- Sub-discipline: Christian Palestinian Aramaic

Margaret Dunlop Gibson
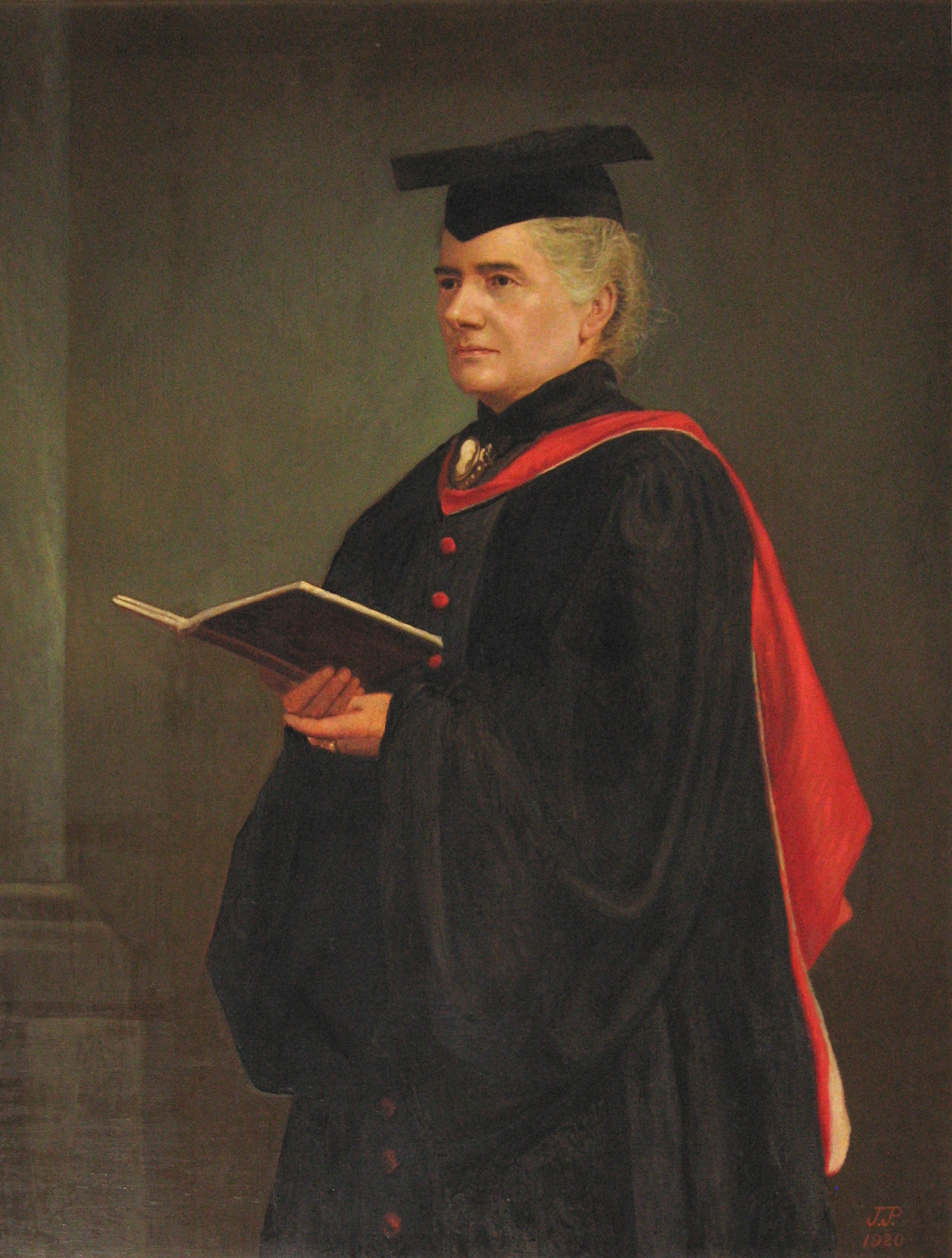
- Gibson painted by John Peddie, 1920
- Born: Margaret Dunlop Smith; 11 January 1843; Irvine, Ayrshire, Scotland
- Died: 11 January 1920 (aged 77); Castle-brae, Chesterton Road, Cambridge, England
- Resting place: Dean Cemetery
- Spouse: James Young Gibson (m. 1883; died 1886)
- Awards: Triennial Gold Medal of the Royal Asiatic Society, 1915

Academic work
- Discipline: Syriac studies; Arab studies

Agnes Smith Lewis (née Smith; 16 April 1843 – 26 March 1926) and Margaret Dunlop Gibson (née Smith; 16 April 1843 – 11 January 1920), also referred to as the Westminster Sisters and the Sisters of Sinai, were twin British Syriacists, Arabists, travellers, linguists and writers, active in Cambridge. Learning more than 12 languages between them, specialising in Arabic, Christian Palestinian Aramaic, and Syriac, they became acclaimed scholars in their academic fields, and benefactors of the Presbyterian Church of England, and especially Westminster College, Cambridge.

== Personal life and education ==
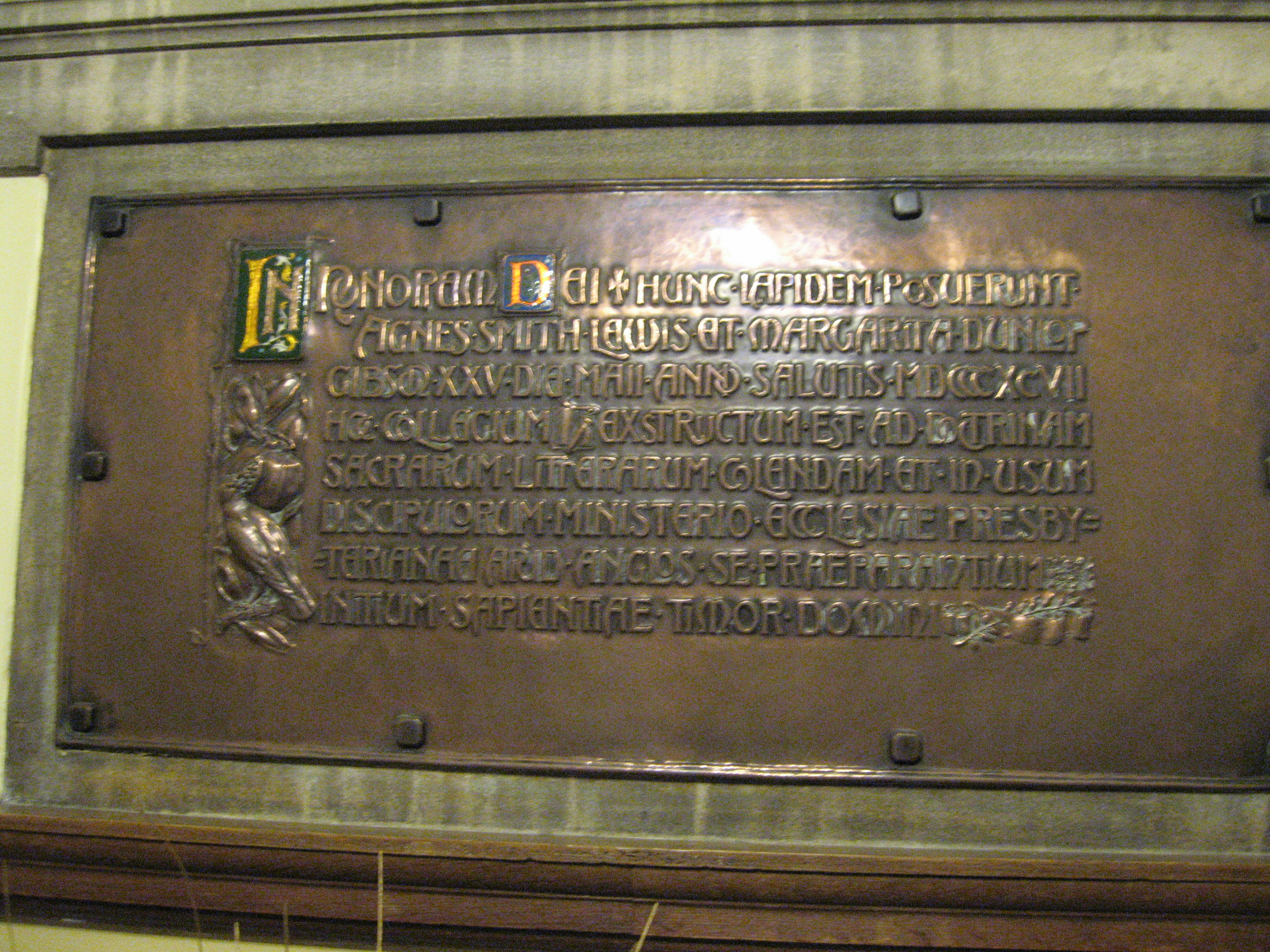
Foundation plaque in Westminster College, Cambridge, commemorating the Smith Sisters

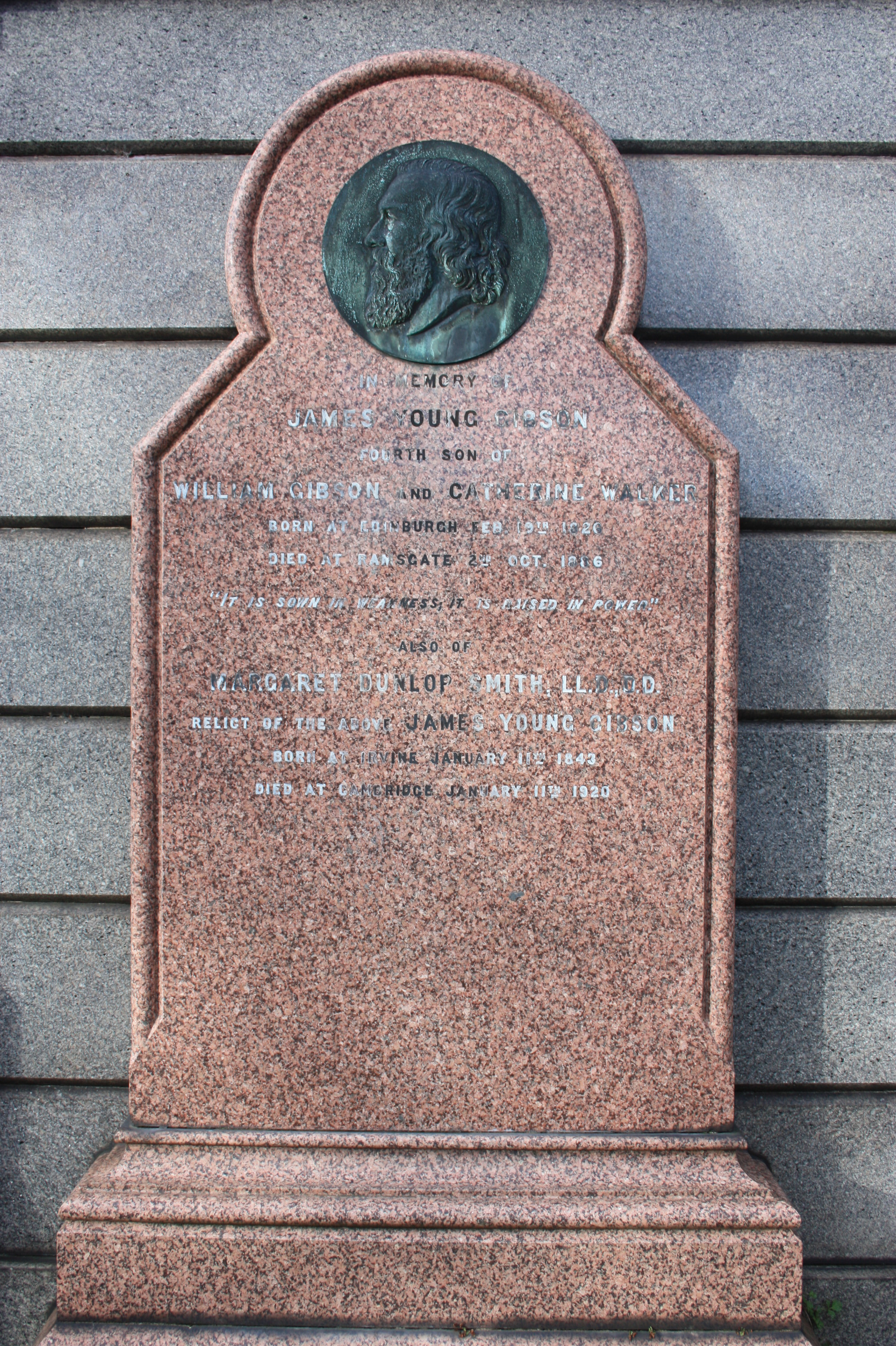
The grave of James Young Gibson and Margaret Dunlop Gibson, Dean Cemetery, Edinburgh

Lewis and Gibson were born Agnes Smith and Margaret Dunlop Smith on 16 April 1843 in Irvine, Ayrshire to Scottish Presbyterian parents. Their father, John Smith (c. 1802–1866), was a solicitor and writer to the signet and their mother, Margaret Smith (née Dunlop; died 1843), died three weeks after their birth. Raised by nannies and governesses, the twins were taught Latin, French, and German and travelled Europe with their father.

From 1858 to 1863, they were educated at the Irvine Royal Academy and at boarding schools in Birkenhead and Kensington. Following their father's death in 1866, they were left a large inheritance. They settled in London and joined the Presbyterian church in Clapham Road. Already conversationally fluent in German, French and Italian, they continued to expand their linguistic interests and travel Europe, then explore the Middle East, including the Nile and Palestine in 1868. In 1870, Agnes wrote Eastern Pilgrims, an account of their experiences in both Egypt and Palestine.

In 1883, the twins, quite fluent in modern Greek, travelled to Athens and other parts of Greece, beginning a lifelong affectionate relationship with Greek Orthodoxy, especially the monks in office at Saint Catherine's Monastery, Sinai, hence, the Sinai Sisters. On 11 September 1883, Margaret married James Young Gibson, a scholar trained for the ministry of the United Presbyterian Church, but later working on Spanish translations. On 12 December 1887, Agnes married the librarian, antiquary and clergyman Samuel Savage Lewis. Each marriage soon ended with the death of the husband.

Margaret was buried with her husband in Dean Cemetery in western Edinburgh. The grave lies on the north wall of the main cemetery. Agnes was buried with hers in Mill Road Cemetery, Cambridge.

== Academic work ==
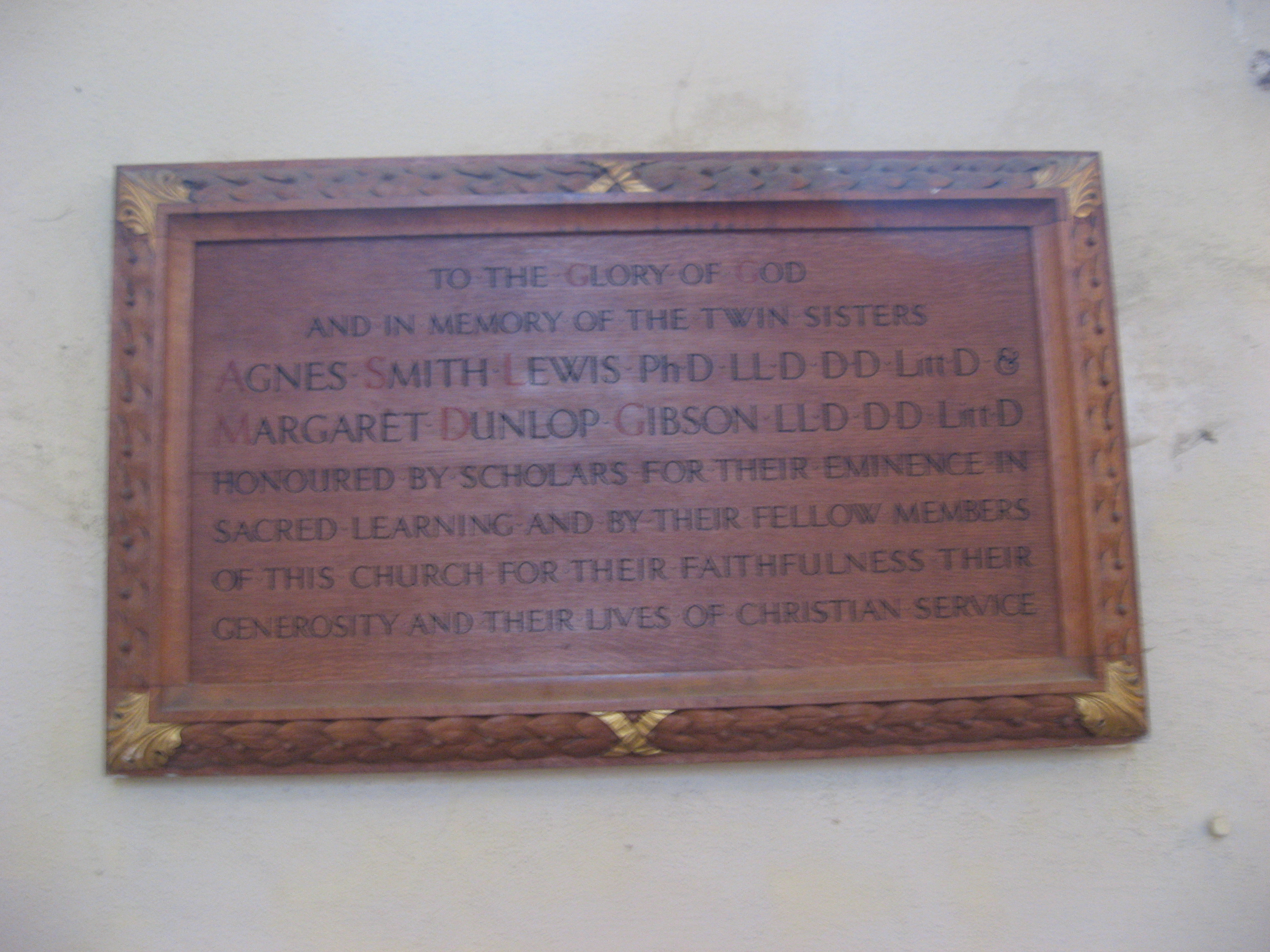
Plaque in St Columba's Church, Cambridge, commemorating Agnes and Margaret Smith

By 1890, the sisters settled in Cambridge. Agnes began to study Syriac. Inspired by Quaker and Orientalist J. Rendel Harris's account of his discovery at Saint Catherine's Monastery of a Syriac text of the Apology of Aristides, they travelled to the monastery in 1892, and discovered one of the earliest Syriac versions of the Old Syriac Gospels next to the earlier known Curetonian Gospels, now in the British Library, which gave insight into the Syriac transmission and added valuable variants to New Testament studies. It was one of the most important palimpsest manuscript finds since that of the Codex Sinaiticus in 1859 by Constantin von Tischendorf. The following year (1893), they returned with three Cambridge scholars, Professor Robert L. Bensly and Francis C. Burkitt, and their wives, as well as J. Rendel Harris, to copy the whole manuscript. The palimpsest manuscript was found to have been overwritten by the Lives of Holy Women in Syriac dated to 779 CE by John the Recluse as well as also having four 6th-century folios with a Syriac witness of the Departure of Mary (Transitus Mariae) underneath.

Her second most valuable attribution to the field of Aramaic (Christian Palestinian Aramaic, Syriac) studies and Old and New Testament text critique was the purchase of another unique palimpsest manuscript, the Codex Climaci Rescriptus, in Egypt (Cairo 1895; Port Tewfik 1906). The largest batch was from an anonymous Berlin (Germany) scholar (1905), containing underneath several individual manuscripts in Christian Palestinian Aramaic of various lectionaries with Gospels, Epistles, and Old Testament pericopes, an early apocryphal text Dormition of Mary with the hagiographic story of Peter and Paul (5th–7th century), and Greek with Gospels (7th/8th centuries), overwritten by the Syriac translation of Scala paradisi and Liber ad pastorem by the monk John Climacus of Sinai (8th–9th century), of which now surfaced the missing quire at Saint Catherine’s Monastery.

After the return from their first trip to Sinai Agnes made herself acquainted with Christian Palestinian Aramaic (Palestinian Syriac) by the help of a script table by Julius Euting (German Orientalist). Margaret learned Arabic. During this expedition, Agnes catalogued the collection of Syriac and Margaret of Arabic manuscripts. It was also on their first expedition (1892) that they were made acquainted with two additional, complete, and dated Christian Palestinian Aramaic Palestinian Syriac version of the Bible, now designated syr^{pal}, Gospel lectionaries B and C (A.D. 1104 and 1118) and remnant D in the library of Saint Catherine's Monastery, which they edited 1899 in a synoptic version, including the earlier published Vatican Gospel A from 1030 (Vat. sir. 19).

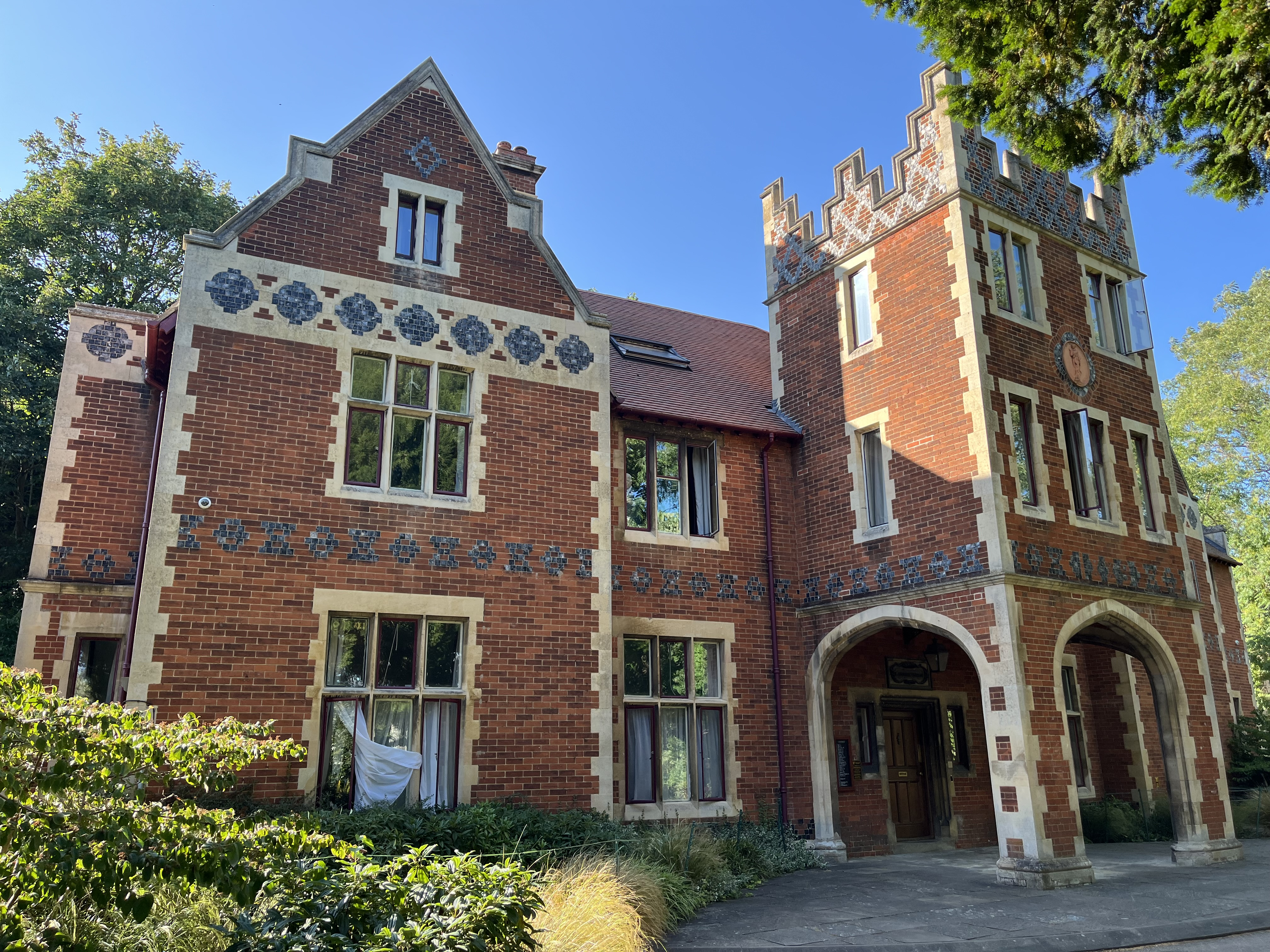
Their joint home, Castlebrae in Cambridge

During their travels to Egypt, Agnes S. Lewis and Margaret D. Gibson were able to acquire among other unique manuscripts in Christian Palestinian Aramaic as e.g. an hagiographic palimpsest manuscript The Forty Martyrs of Sinai, and Eulogios the stone-cutter from the 6th–7th century (1906) overwritten by a Christian Arabic text (8th century); a nearly complete 11th-century lectionary in 1895 of Christian Palestinian Aramaic with noteworthy biblical pericopes, and later 1905 some of the missing folios from a German collector (Westminster College, Cambridge); and several leaves under Syriac Christian homilies where Agnes detected separate 7th- and 8th-century Qu'ranic manuscripts, which she and Alphonse Mingana dated as possibly pre-Uthmanic. These palimpsest folios were lent to the exhibition “Internationale Ausstellung für Buchgewerbe und Graphik" in Leipzig 1914, and due to the outbreak of the First World War they were only returned in 1936 after the successful intervention by Paul Kahle. They collected about 1,700 manuscript fragments and books including the acquisition of Eberhard Nestle library with rare editions, now known as the Lewis-Gibson collection, including some formerly of the Cairo Genizah of the Ben Ezra Synagogue in Old Cairo, the earliest Hebrew fragments of a Ecclesiasticus manuscript, identified by Solomon Schechter. The sisters continued to travel and write until the First World War when they slowly withdrew from their activity as scholars due to ill health.

Though the University of Cambridge never honoured the two scholarly twins with degrees, they received honorary degrees from the universities of Halle, Heidelberg, Dublin, and St Andrews, and both were honoured in addition with the Triennial gold medal of the Royal Asiatic Society, the blue riband of oriental research in 1915.

At Cambridge, they attended St Columba's Church. They hosted social events for their circle of intellectual and religious contemporaries at their home, Castlebrae, off Chesterton Lane, Cambridge. Castlebrae, adjacent to Cambridge Castle, is now part of Clare College, Cambridge.

== Benefaction ==
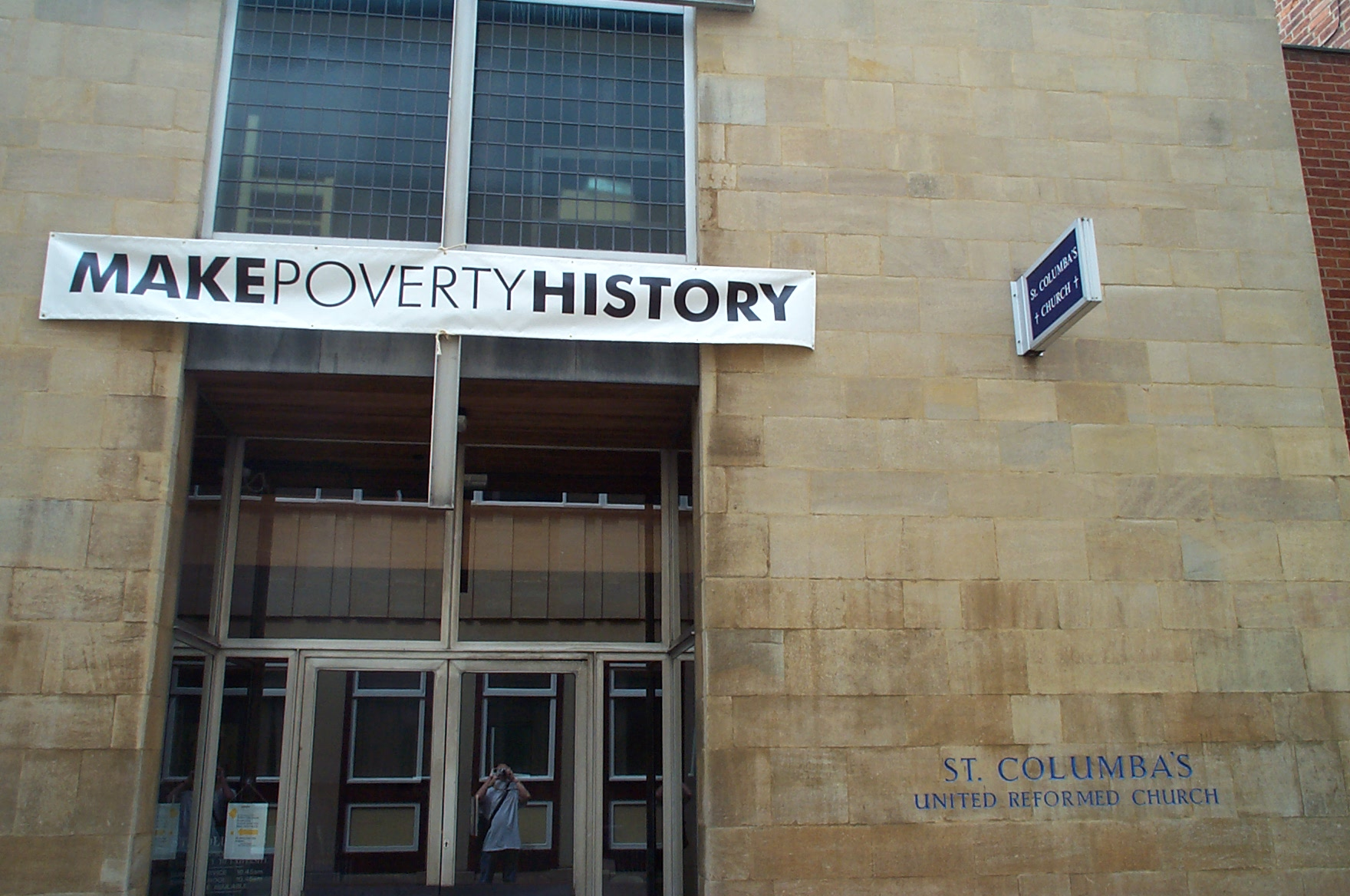
St Columba's United Reformed Church, Oxford, established as the Presbyterian chaplaincy to the University of Oxford, with the help of the Smith sisters

The sisters used their inheritance to endow the grounds and part of the buildings of Westminster College in Cambridge. This was long after Nonconformists were allowed to become full members of the Oxbridge universities by the repeal of the Test and Corporation Acts; and that Presbyterian college moved from Queen Square, London to a site acquired from St John's College, Cambridge in 1899. They also helped the establishment of the Presbyterian chaplaincy to the University of Oxford, now at St Columba's United Reformed Church, Oxford.

== Works ==
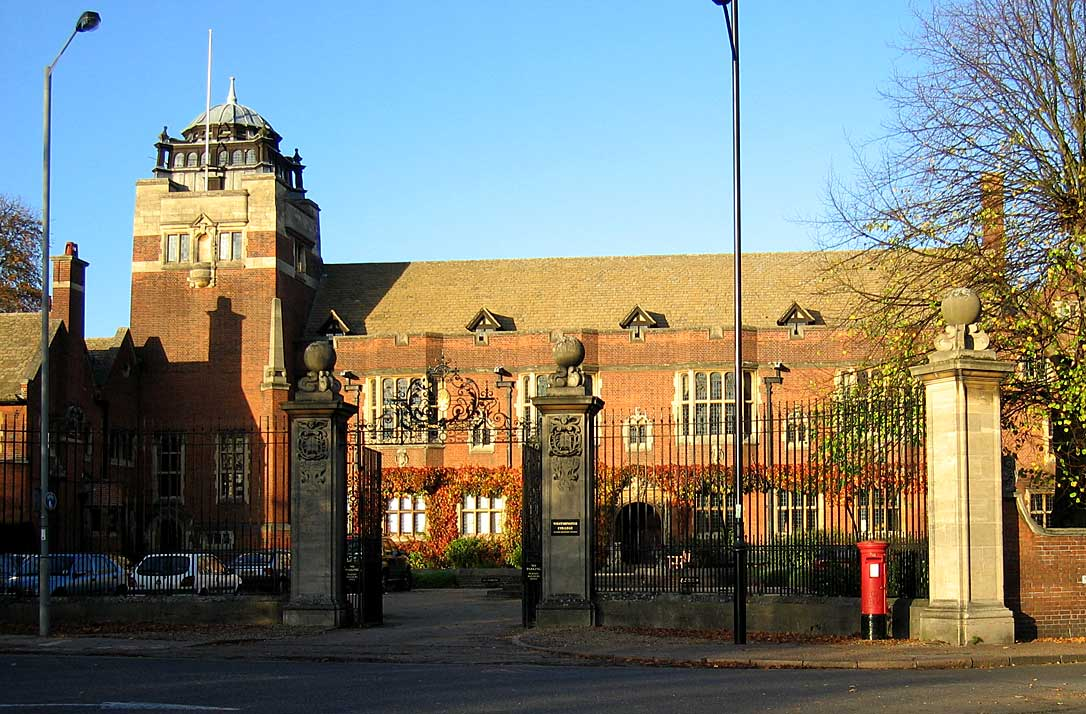
Westminster College, Cambridge, beneficiary of the Westminster Sisters

=== Agnes Smith Lewis ===
- Eastern Pilgrims: The travels of three ladies (London, 1870)
- Effie Maxwell (London, 1876) (a novel)
- The Brides of Ardmore: A story of Irish life (London, 1880)
- Through Cyprus (London, 1887)
- Glimpses of Greek Life and Scenery (London, 1884)
- Catalogue of the Syriac MSS. in the Convent of S. Catharine on Mount Sinai (London, 1894)
- A Translation of the Four Gospels from the Syriac of the Sinaitic Palimpsest (London and New York, 1894)
- A Translation of the Four Gospels from the Syriac of the Sinaitic Palimpsest (London, 1896) (revised and extended edition)
- Some Pages of the Four Gospels Re-transcribed from the Sinaitic Palimpsest with a Translation of the Whole Text (London, 1896)
- In the Shadow of Sinai: A story of travel and research from 1895 to 1897 (Cambridge, 1898)
- Select Narratives of Holy Women: From the Syro-Antiochene or Sinai Palimpsest (London, 1900)
- Apocrypha Syriaca: The Protevangelium Jacobi and Transitus Mariae (London, 1902, with Alphonse Mingana)
- Acta Mythologica Apostolorum (London, 1904) (Texts; English translation)
- Supplement to a Palestinian Syriac Lectionary (Cambridge, 1907)
- Codex Climaci Rescriptus: Fragments of the Sixth-Century Palestinian Syriac Texts of the Gospels, of the Acts of the Apostles, and of St Paul’s Epistles (London, 1909)
- The Old Syriac Gospels or Evangelion da-Mepharreshê (London, 1910)
- The Forty Martyrs of the Sinai Desert and the Story of Eulogius from a Palestinian Syriac and Arabic Palimpsest (Cambridge, 1912)
- Light on the Four Gospels from the Sinai Palimpsest (London, 1913)
- Leaves From Three Ancient Qur'ans; Possibly Pre-Othmanic (Cambridge, 1914, with Alphonse Mingana)
- Margaret Atheling And other Poems (London: Williams and Norgate, 1917)

=== Margaret Dunlop Gibson ===
- How the Codex Was Found: A narrative of two visits to Sinai from Mrs. Lewis's journals, 1892 – 1893 (Cambridge, 1893)
- An Arabic Version of the Epistles of St. Paul to the Romans, Corinthians, Galatians with part of the Epistle to the Ephesians from a ninth century MS. in the Convent of Saint Catharine on Mount Sinai. (London, 1894)
- Catalogue of the Arabic mss. in the Convent of Saint Catharine on Mount Sinai. (London, 1894)
- An Arabic Version of the Acts of the Apostles and the Seven Catholic Epistles. (London 1899)
- The Commentaries of Ishodad of Merv, Bishop of Hadatha c. 850 ad. (London 1911)
- Matthew and Mark in Syriac. (London 1911)
- Luke and John in Syriac. (London 1911)
- The Acts of the Apostles and the Catholic Fathers. (London 1913)
- The Epistles of St Paul. (London 1916)

=== Agnes Smith Lewis and Margaret Dunlop Gibson ===
- A Palestinian Syriac Lectionary containing Lessons from The Pentateuch, Job, Proverbs, Prophest, Acts, and Epistles (London, 1897)
- The Palestinian Syriac Lectionary of the Gospels (London, 1899)
- Palestinian Syriac Texts from palimpsest fragments in the Taylor-Schechter collection (London, 1900)

== Archives ==
A collection of scrapbooks of press cuttings relating to Agnes Smith Lewis and Margaret Dunlop Gibson can be found at the Cadbury Research Library, University of Birmingham.
