= Samuel Savage Lewis =

British librarian, antiquary and clergyman (1836–1891)

The Reverend Samuel Savage Lewis FSA

Personal life
- Born: 13 July 1836 Spital Square, Middlesex, England
- Died: 31 March 1891 (aged 54) Near Oxford, England
- Resting place: Mill Road Cemetery
- Partner: Mary Catherine Hack
- Spouse: Agnes Smith Lewis (m. 1887)
- Education: Corpus Christi College, Cambridge
- Other names: S. S. Lewis; Satan Lewis
- Occupation: Librarian; clergyman
- Relatives: Bunnell Lewis (half-brother); Margaret Dunlop Gibson (sister-in-law); James Young Gibson (brother-in-law); Philip Henry (fourth great-grandfather)

Religious life
- Religion: Church of England
- Ordination: 1872

Samuel Savage Lewis (13 July 1836 – 31 March 1891), also known as S. S. Lewis and Satan Lewis, was a British librarian, antiquary, and Church of England clergyman. Elected a fellow of Corpus Christi College in 1869, Lewis worked as the college librarian from 1870 until his death.

== Early life ==
Lewis was born on 13 July 1836 in Spital Square, Middlesex (present-day London) to William Jonas Lewis, a surgeon and deacon, and Elizabeth Lewis (née Bunnell; died 1865). One of 10 siblings, Lewis had 2 older half-siblings, including the archaeologist Bunnell Lewis, from his father's first marriage to his aunt Mary Lewis (née Bunnell). The maternal fourth great-grandson of the nonconformist Philip Henry, Lewis was also the paternal grandson of the Welsh theologian and independent minister George Lewis (1763–1822).

Educated at the City of London School, Lewis won the Carpenter Scholarship in 1847. Enrolling at St John's College, Cambridge on 13 October 1854, Lewis later left Cambridge due to a decline in his vision.

== Career ==
Becoming an agricultural student, Lewis worked in Shepreth from March to July 1856 and in Woodhurst from July 1856 till September 1857. On 9 September, Lewis left England to become an agricultural worker in Canada, where he later formed a relationship with Mary Catherine Hack. Following Hack's death in August 1860, Lewis returned to England via Quebec on 10 November. Initially attempting to work as a private tutor, Lewis began working at Shaw Farm in 1861. Fluent in French, German and Italian, Lewis was tasked alongside his agricultural work to accompany foreign visitors. During this period he was also a superintendent of a Sunday school in or near Windsor.

In an attempt to improve his eyesight, Lewis underwent an ophthalmic vivisection under George Critchett on 16 November 1864, and a second surgery on the lateral rectus muscle on 7 December. Visiting Cambridge in late December, Lewis arranged to re-enrol at St John's College in January 1865. (Note: Also cited as re-enrolling in December 1864.) At the time of his re-enrollment he already had an interest in numismatics. Lewis transferred to Corpus Christi College in the Spring of 1865, as the college's tutors were willing to provide accommodations for his low vision. Graduating from the Classical Tripos in 1869, Lewis was elected a fellow of Corpus Christi on 21 April.

The following year Lewis was appointed the librarian of Corpus Christi, a position he held until his death. During his lifetime Lewis collected 4,299 ancient artefacts from across Europe, the Mediterranean and the Middle East. He also amassed around 5,000 coins, and began collecting solidi in the early 1870s. As librarian, Lewis had a suite in the Corpus Christi's Old Court in which he displayed his collection as a private museum.

On 22 March 1872, Lewis was elected a fellow of the Society of Antiquaries of London. The same year Lewis ordained deacon at Ely and graduated from Corpus Christi with his Master's. Lewis became a priest in 1873.

== Personal life and legacy ==
Lewis had some form of congenital heart disease, which was believed to have been the cause of death for five of his siblings. On 12 December 1887, Lewis married the Syriacist, Arabist and writer Agnes Smith Lewis.

On 31 March 1891, died from heart failure whilst travelling with Agnes on a train near Oxford. Buried at Mill Road Cemetery, Agnes was later buried alongside him following her death in 1926. Bequeathing his collection to Corpus Christi College, the collection has been on a long-term loan to the Fitzwilliam Museum since 1990.
