= Charlotte Burbury =

British educationist

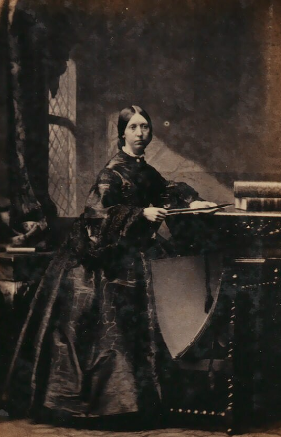
- Born: 1832; Harrow School
- Died: 14 November 1895 (aged 62–63); Richmond, London
- Occupation: educationalist
- Known for: supporting women's education
- Spouse: William Burbury

Charlotte Amy May Kennedy became Charlotte Amy May Burbury (1832 – 14 November 1895) was a British educationist. She was the secretary of the London National Society for Women's Suffrage as well as serving as a governor of the first English hospital to train women doctors and an early day-school for girls. She also supported the committee of the Society for the Employment of Women.

== Life ==
Burbury was the first child of Janet and Benjamin Hall Kennedy and she was the only one of her siblings not born at Shrewsbury School where her father became the headmaster at the school where was educated. She was born at The Grove at Harrow School. Her father was inspiring, but her mother was the organised one who managed the family's money. Her younger sister Marion was known as 'Maisie' within the family. She was baptised on 19 June 1832.

On 10 June 1852, she married William Burbury who was then teaching at her father's Shrewsbury School. They had no children and in 1861 her husband became the rector of West Felton. She employed herself as the secretary of the Cambridge Local Examinations Board for a decade.

Her husband died leaving the "living" in West Felton vacant and this job was taken on by her father. Meanwhile her younger sisters Marion and Julia who had stayed in the family home, moved to Cambridge in 1867 with the family when her father became the Regius Professor of Greek.

In 1870 she joined the Society for Promoting the Employment of Women which had been founded in 1859.

In 1871 she became the London National Society for Women's Suffrage, secretary. This society is known today as the Fawcett Society because Millicent Fawcett was one of its early supporters.

In 1873 she stood as a candidate to become a member of the London school board (as women were allowed to stand for this public position), but she was not elected. From 1870 until her death, she was a member of the committee of the Society for the Employment of Women. She supported the first training of women doctors in England serving as a governor of the London School of Medicine for Women which opened in 1874.

The North London Collegiate School which had started in 1850 as a day school offering education to girls. Burbury also served as a governor of this venture.

Burbury died on 14 November 1895, aged 63, in Richmond, London, leaving effects worth £5369 13s 2d.
