= St Columba's United Reformed Church, Oxford =

Church in Oxford, England

Coordinates: 51.7517°N 1.2559°W

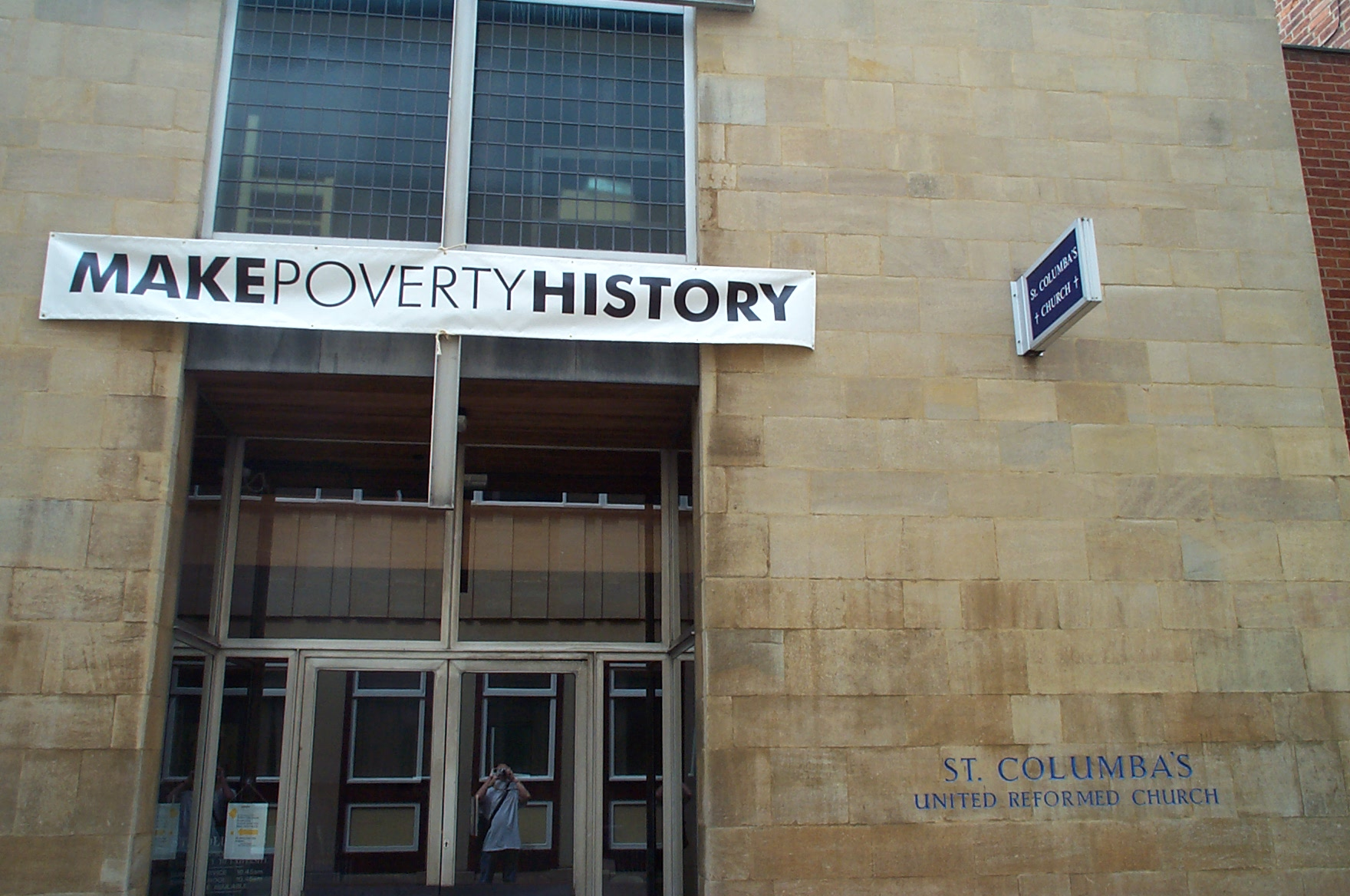
St Columba's United Reformed Church, Oxford

St Columba's United Reformed Church is a congregation of the United Reformed Church (URC) in the centre of the city of Oxford. It is located on Alfred Street, off the High Street.

== History ==
It was founded as a chaplaincy to Presbyterian students in Oxford in 1908 and was initially a joint initiative by the Church of Scotland, the United Free Church of Scotland, and the Presbyterian Church of England.

It became a congregation of the Presbyterian Church of England in 1929, and on the union of the Presbyterian and Congregational churches in 1972, a congregation of the United Reformed Church (URC).

The church continues to provide a chaplaincy to students in the University of Oxford from Reformed, Presbyterian and Congregational church backgrounds.

The congregation has included John Buchan (an elder), Ran Laurie and his son Hugh, and Guy Warrack (organist).

== Building ==
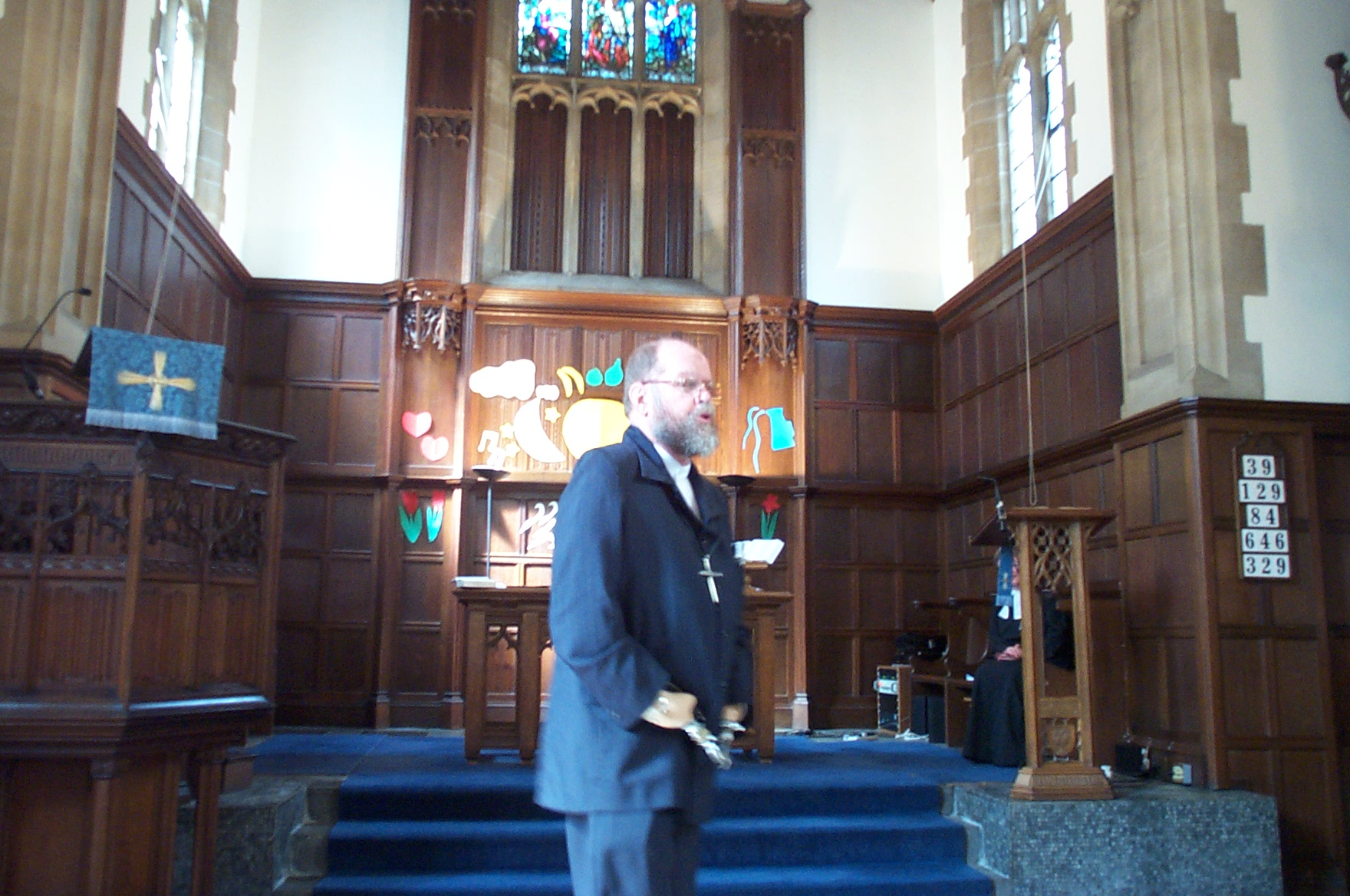
Michael Lapsley preaching inside the church in 2005

The church building dates to 1915, and was designed by T. P. Figgis. The foundation stone was laid by James Bryce, 1st Viscount Bryce in 1914. Funding for the building was provided in part by Agnes and Margaret Smith, the 'Sisters of the Sinai'. The church has a long nave and shallow, rectangular chancel. The stained glass in the chancel was made by Theodora Salusbury. The front courtyard was replaced in 1960 when a vestibule, designed by E. Brian Smith, was added to the church. Pevsner described the building as 'well-mannered'.

== LGBTQ Ministry ==
St Columba's performs same-sex marriages and blesses civil partnerships. The church also hosts First Sunday, fellowship for LGBTQ Christians.

== Ministers ==
Among the Ministers to have served the church are:

- Revd David Lusk (father of Mary Levison)
- Revd Roy Drummond Whitehorn, later Principal of Westminster College, Cambridge
- Revd Ray Bailey
- Revd John Thornton
- Revd Caryl Micklem (1978–1990)
- Revd Wesley Workman (1990–1992)
- Revd Dr Susan Durber (1995–2007), later Principal of Westminster College, Cambridge
- Revd Dr Carla Grosch-Miller (2008–2016)
- Revd Helen Garton (since 2018)

Since 2001, the church has shared ministry with Cumnor United Reformed Church.
