= Thompson Cooper =

English journalist, man of letters and compiler of reference works

- Born: 8 January 1837; Cambridge, England
- Died: 5 March 1904; London, England
- Resting place: Norwood Cemetery
- Notable works: Contributed to Dictionary of National Biography

Thompson Cooper (8 January 1837 – 5 March 1904) was an English journalist, man of letters, and compiler of reference works. He became a specialist in biographical information, and is noted as the most prolific contributor to the Victorian era Dictionary of National Biography, for which he wrote 1,423 entries (other sources say 1,422)

== Life ==
Thompson Cooper was the son of Charles Henry Cooper, a Cambridge solicitor and antiquarian. Educated privately in Cambridge, Cooper was nominally articled to his father, and joined him in his antiquarian pursuits. He became a Fellow of the Society of Antiquaries aged 23, and at some point converted to Roman Catholicism.

As a young man, he was a parliamentary reporter, and developed an interest in shorthand. His Parliamentary Short-Hand was published in 1858. Cooper became sub-editor on the Daily Telegraph in 1861, and the paper's parliamentary reporter in 1862. In 1866 he began a long connection with The Times: he was the paper's parliamentary reporter 1866–1886, its summary-writer for the House of Commons 1886–98, and from 1898 its summary-writer for the House of Lords.

== Reference works ==
With his father Charles Henry Cooper, he compiled Athenae Cantabrigienses, a biographical work covering alumni of the University of Cambridge.

The Register and Magazine of Biography (1869) was a short-lived periodical venture for John Gough Nichols, covering contemporary biography only, and lasting six months. In the opening pages of Volume the First, dated 30 August 1869, Cooper explained the need for such a compilation at the time:

From an early period of our News literature, such events (births, marriages and deaths) have been made public by announcements in the flying sheet; and for the last century and a half they have been more permanently recorded in the pages of the monthly Magazines. At the present time however this public service, as it may justly be termed, is inefficiently performed. The magazines have entered on a new phase, and are devoted almost entirely to transient entertainment or discussion, while the daily and weekly papers are, when once laid aside, exceedingly difficult of access and reference.

A New Biographical Dictionary appeared in 1873, and was subsequently developed under various titles.

Men of Mark: A Gallery of Contemporary Portraits was a series of photographic portraits, accompanied by short biographies from Cooper. It was published from 1876 to 1883.

Cooper therefore brought considerable experience to the DNB when it launched in the 1880s. He played a general editorial role as "compiler of the lists of names to be treated under B and future letters", but his speciality as a contributor was "Roman Catholic divines and writers". He was also a prolific contributor to the Catholic Encyclopaedia.

He was buried in Norwood Cemetery.

== Notes ==
- "Obituary. Mr. Thompson Cooper (transcription)". The Times. Vol. 37335. London. 7 March 1904. p. 10; col D.

== Sources ==
- Cooper, Thompson, ed. (30 August 1869). The Register, and Magazine of Biography, A Record of Births, Marriages, Deaths, and other Genealogical and Personal Occurrences. Volume the First. Westminster: Nichols and Sons, 25, Parliament Street.
