= James Young Gibson =

Scottish translator, writer and former minister (1826–1886)

The Rev. James Young Gibson
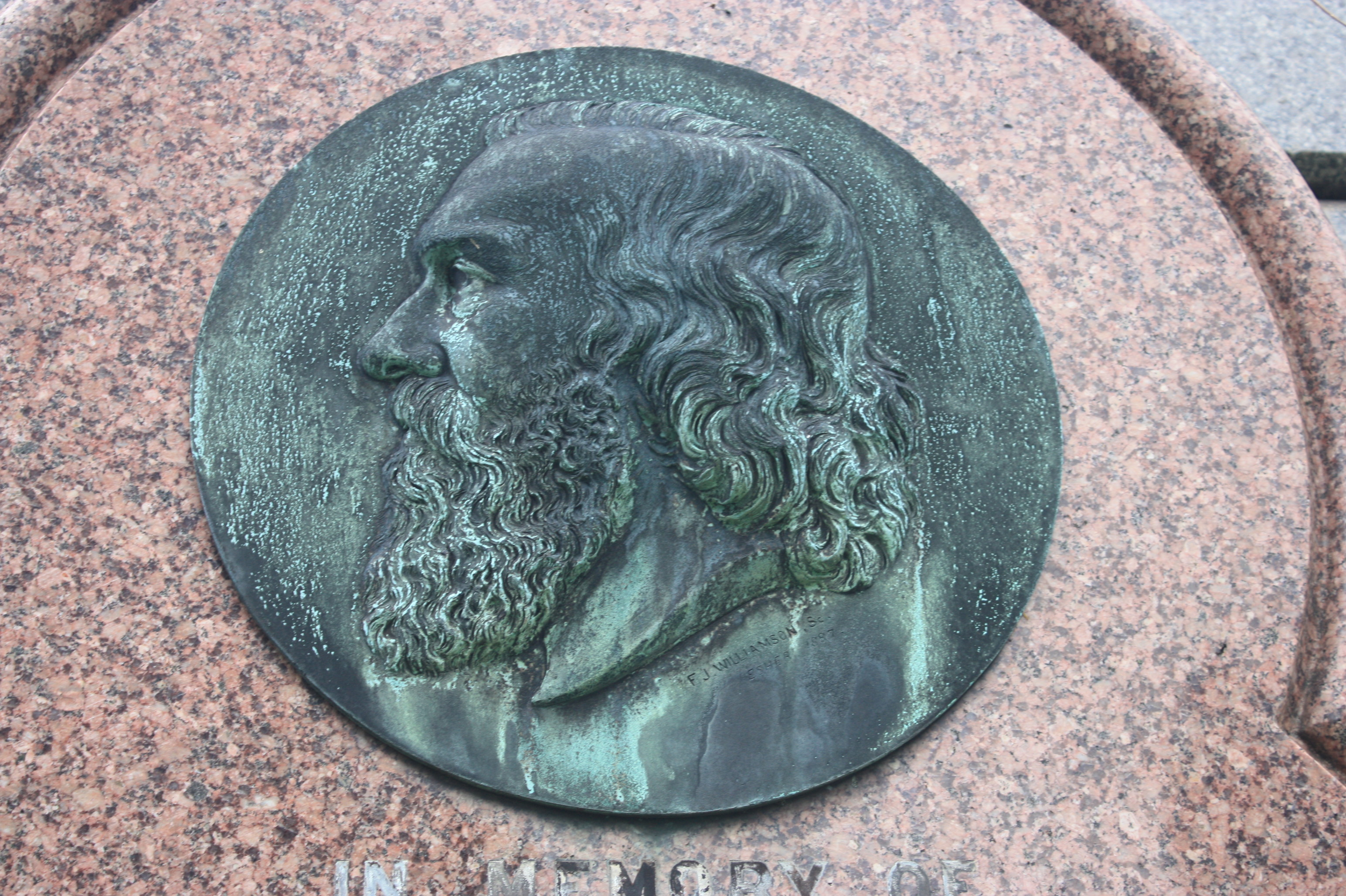
- Grave monument Gibson at Dean Cemetery

Personal life
- Born: 19 February 1826 Edinburgh, Scotland
- Died: 2 October 1886 (aged 60) Ramsgate, England
- Resting place: Dean Cemetery
- Spouse: Margaret Dunlop Gibson (m. 1887)
- Notable work(s): The Cid Ballads and Other Poems and Translations from Spanish and German, 1887
- Education: United Presbyterian Synod Hall and Divinity College
- Occupation: Translator; writer
- Relatives: Agnes Smith Lewis (sister-in-law); Samuel Savage Lewis (brother-in-law)

Religious life
- Religion: Presbyterian
- Church: United Presbyterian Church
- Ordination: 1856

The Rev. James Young Gibson (19 February 1826 – 2 October 1886) was a Scottish translator, writer and former Presbyterian minister. Gibson is noted for his work helping Alexander James Duffield translate Don Quixote into English in 1881, and on his own translations of Journey to Parnassus in 1883, Numantia in 1885 and El Cid in 1887.

== Life ==
Gibson was born on 19 February 1826 in Edinburgh to William Gibson (died c. 1859), a corn merchant, and Catherine Gibson (née Walker; died 1836). Baptised at St Cuthbert's Church, Gibson was the fourth of six brothers.

Attending schools in Edinburgh, Bathgate and Chipping Ongar, Gibson enrolled at the University of Edinburgh in 1842 but did not graduate. Later studying at Edinburgh's United Presbyterian Synod Hall and Divinity College from 1847 to 1852, Gibson studied German and Hebrew.at Martin Luther University Halle-Wittenberg during the college's 1850 to 1851 recess.

Licensed as a preacher on the 1 February 1853, Gibson began working as a preacher across the country and for a year as tutor at Keswick Hall to the family of Henry Birkbeck. Gibson was ordained on 30 July 1856, and took a position as a United Presbyterian minister in Melrose. He held this role until his health broke down in 1859. He then took a long break in which he devoted himself to study and travelling, including a trip to Cairo and the Holy Land in 1865.

In 1871 he accompanied Alexander J. Duffield on a tour of iron mines in Spain. During this period Gibson developed a strong love of Spanish poetry, and began working on translations. In 1872 he returned to Britain, living in London. By 1878 he was again in poor health. During this period he worked on Duffield's translations of "Don Quixote", adding a more poetical edge to these. This was eventually published in 1881.

On 11 September 1883, rather late in life, he married Margaret Dunlop Smith, one of the "Westminster Sisters". The marriage took place in Wildbad in Germany. She was an intellectual and author having published "How the Codex was Found". From 1884 they lived in Long Ditton.

He died at Ramsgate but is buried in Dean Cemetery in Edinburgh near the north-east corner of the original cemetery. The bronze portrait on his monument is by Francis John Williamson.

Unpublished works and some of his memoirs were posthumously published by his wife, Margaret Dunlop Smith, with additional memoirs by her sister, Agnes Smith Lewis.

== Published works ==
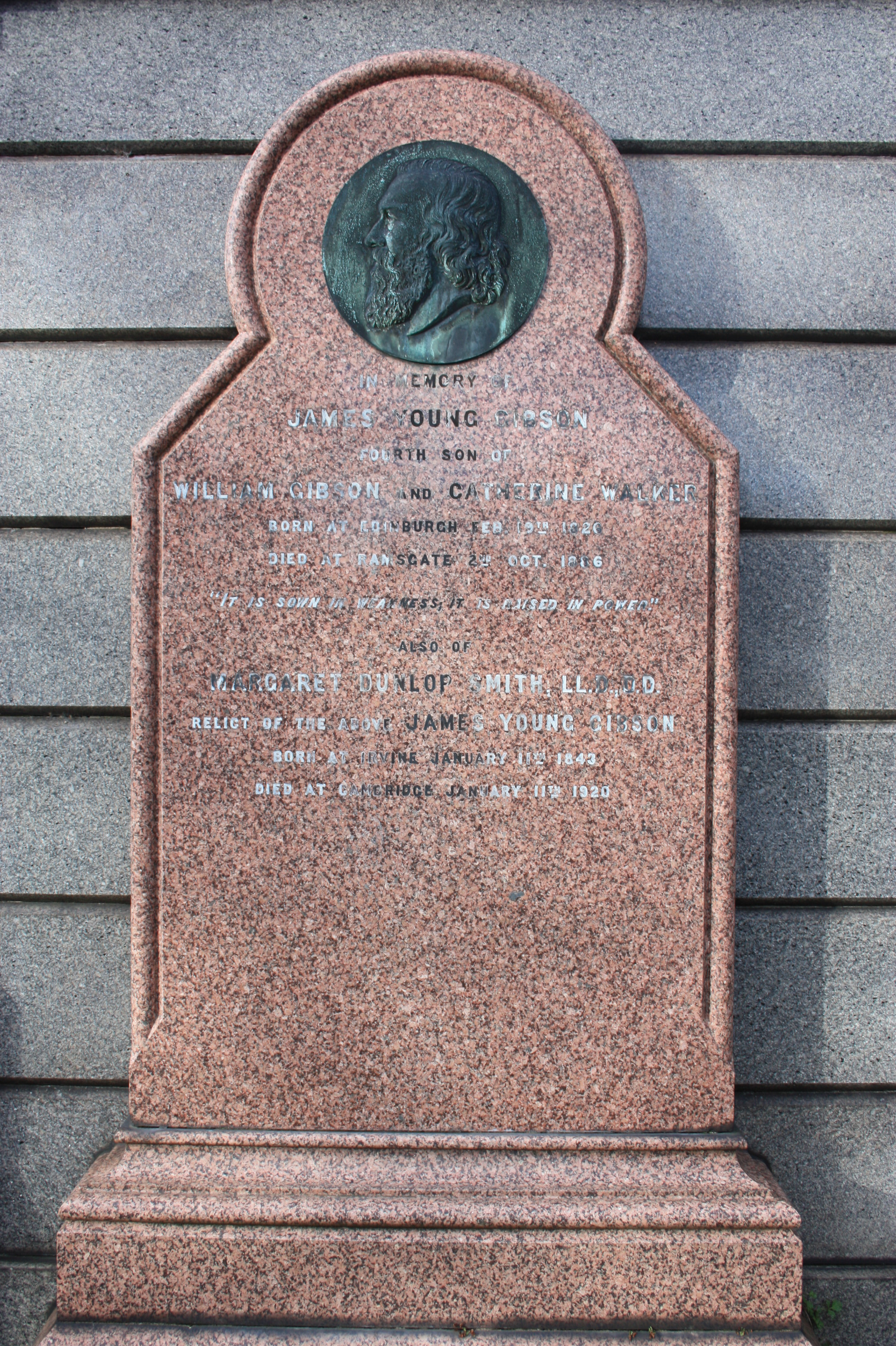
The grave of James Young Gibson and Margaret Dunlop Gibson, Dean Cemetery, Edinburgh

- The Story of the Zulus
- Miguel de Cervantes, Saavedra
- Journey to Parnassus, composed by Cervantes
- Numantia, a Tragedy by Cervantes
- The Cid (El Cid) Ballads and other poems from Spanish and German
