= University Ground, Barnwell =

Former cricket ground in Cambridge, England

University Ground
- Interactive map of University Ground

Ground information
- Location: Cambridge, Cambridgeshire
- Country: United Kingdom
- Coordinates: 52.2021°N 0.1373°E
- Establishment: 1821 (first recorded match)

Team information
Cambridge University	(1821–1830)
- As of 21 August 2010; Source: Ground profile

The University Ground was a cricket ground in Barnwell, a suburb in northeast Cambridge, England. The ground was located off Mill Road and served as the University of Cambridge's main ground from 1821 to 1830. It was surrounded on three sides by open countryside and on one side by the New Barnwell Church. Today the ground no longer exists, with the vast majority of it becoming the Mill Road Cemetery in 1847.

== History ==
Cambridge University Cricket Club moved from Parker's Piece to the University Ground by 1821. The university played its first match at the ground in that year, in a first-class fixture against the Cambridge Town Club. Further first-class matches against the same opposition were held there in 1822, 1825, and 1826. Three first-class matches played in 1827, 1828, and 1829 featured the Cambridge Union Club as the opposition. The final first-class match played there came in 1830, with the Cambridge Town Club returning as the opposition. Cricket ceased to be played at the ground following 1831, with the ground at Parker's Piece improved by levelling, the cricket club returned to playing there. Following abandonment, the location later became the Mill Road Cemetery.

== Records ==
=== First-class ===
- Highest team total: 252 by Cambridge University v Cambridge Union Club, 1829
- Lowest team total: 47 by Cambridge Union Club v Cambridge University, 1827
- Highest individual innings: 97* by George Hume for Cambridge University v Cambridge Town Club, 1821
- Best bowling in an innings: 6-? by Smith for Cambridge University v Cambridge Town Club, 1825 (Note: Many scorecards from this period are incomplete, with Smith's six wicket haul being the best recorded haul at the ground. It is also difficult therefore to ascertain the best figures in the match from incomplete date.)

== See also ==
- Parker's Piece
- Fenner's
- List of cricket grounds in England and Wales
