= Mill Road Cemetery, Cambridge =

Cemetery in Cambridge, England

Coordinates: 52.200520°N 0.136552°E

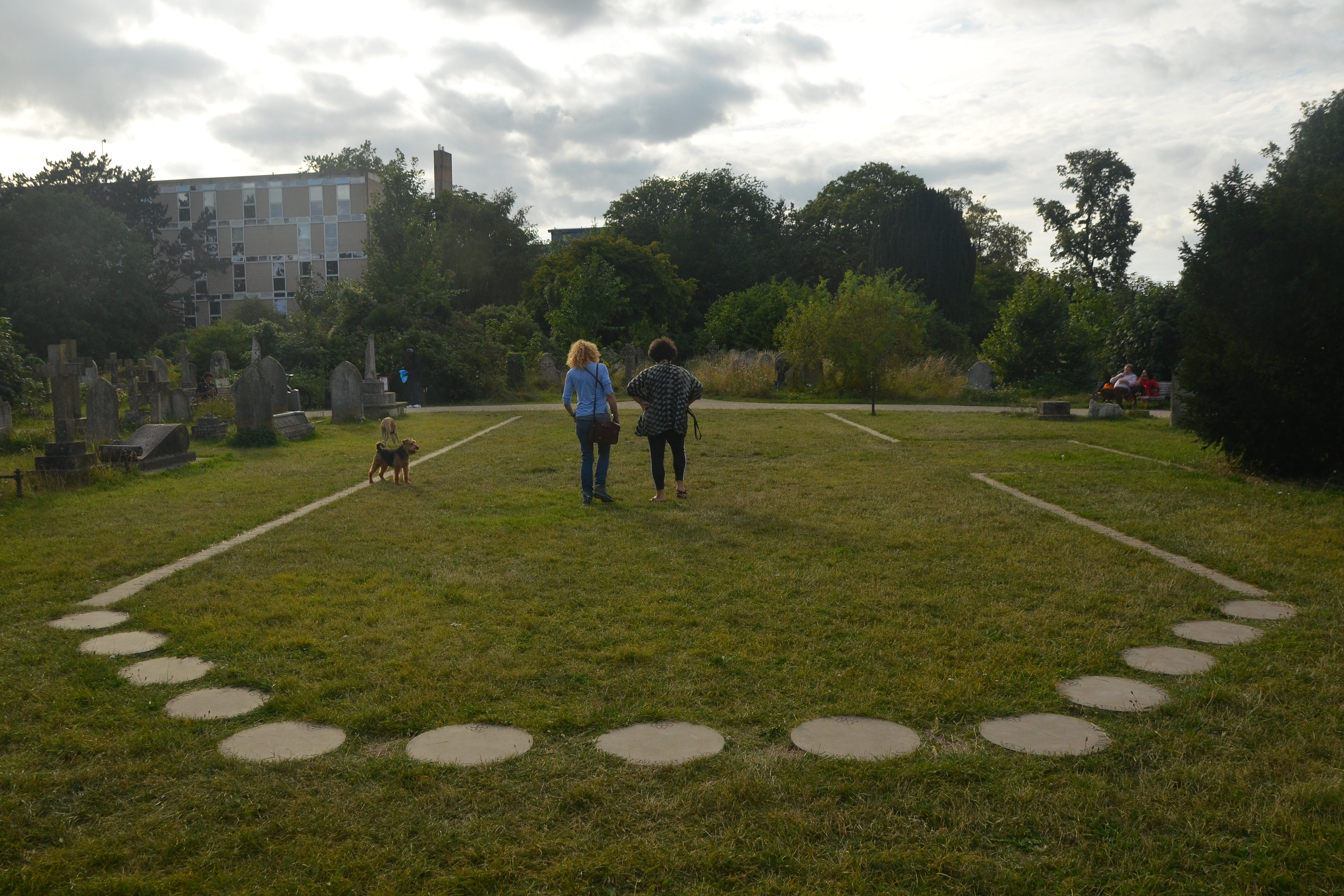
Outline marking the demolished George Gilbert Scott's mortuary chapel in Mill Road Cemetery, Cambridge in August 2021.

Mill Road Cemetery is a cemetery off Mill Road in the Petersfield area of Cambridge, England. Since 2001 the cemetery has been protected as a Grade II Listed site, and several of the tombs are also listed as of special architectural and historical interest.

The cemetery was established in 1848 on a site formerly occupied by a cricket ground, as a collection of burial grounds for 13 city parishes (now 10 through amalgamation) whose churchyards had become full. A chapel built by George Gilbert Scott was demolished in 1954. An outline of the chapel in carved stone was completed in 2017 as a record and memorial, made possible by the National Lottery Heritage Fund. All the plots are now closed for burials, and the cemetery as a whole is by law maintained by the City Council and managed on behalf of the parishes by the Parochial Burial Grounds Management Committee.

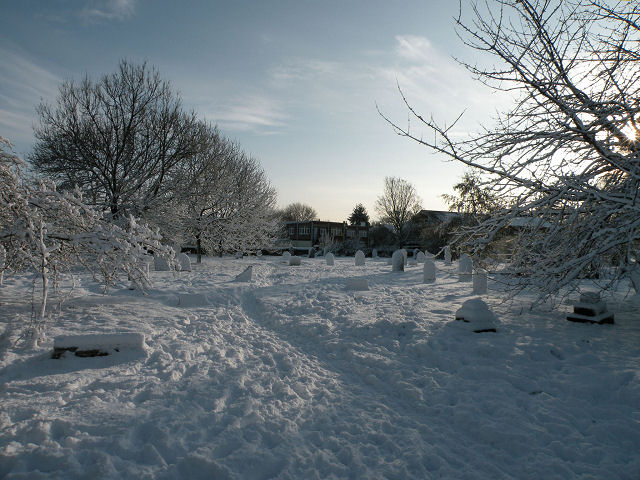
Mill Road Cemetery in winter 2009

The Commonwealth War Graves Commission maintain the graves of 33 Commonwealth service personnel from World War I and 4 from World War II.

The cemetery can be accessed from Mill Road, from Norfolk Street, or through the industrial estate on Gwydir Street.

In February 2014 an art work entitled Bird Stones by Gordon Young was installed in the cemetery. Its one wooden and six stone columns celebrate the bird species found in the cemetery and their birdsong.

The cemetery is also listed as a City Wildlife Site, containing many indicator plant species for undisturbed neutral/calcareous grassland amongst the 110+ species identified. At least 35 species of bird, 23 species of butterflies and several species of mammal have also been reported, including the European dormouse and weasel.

== Burials ==
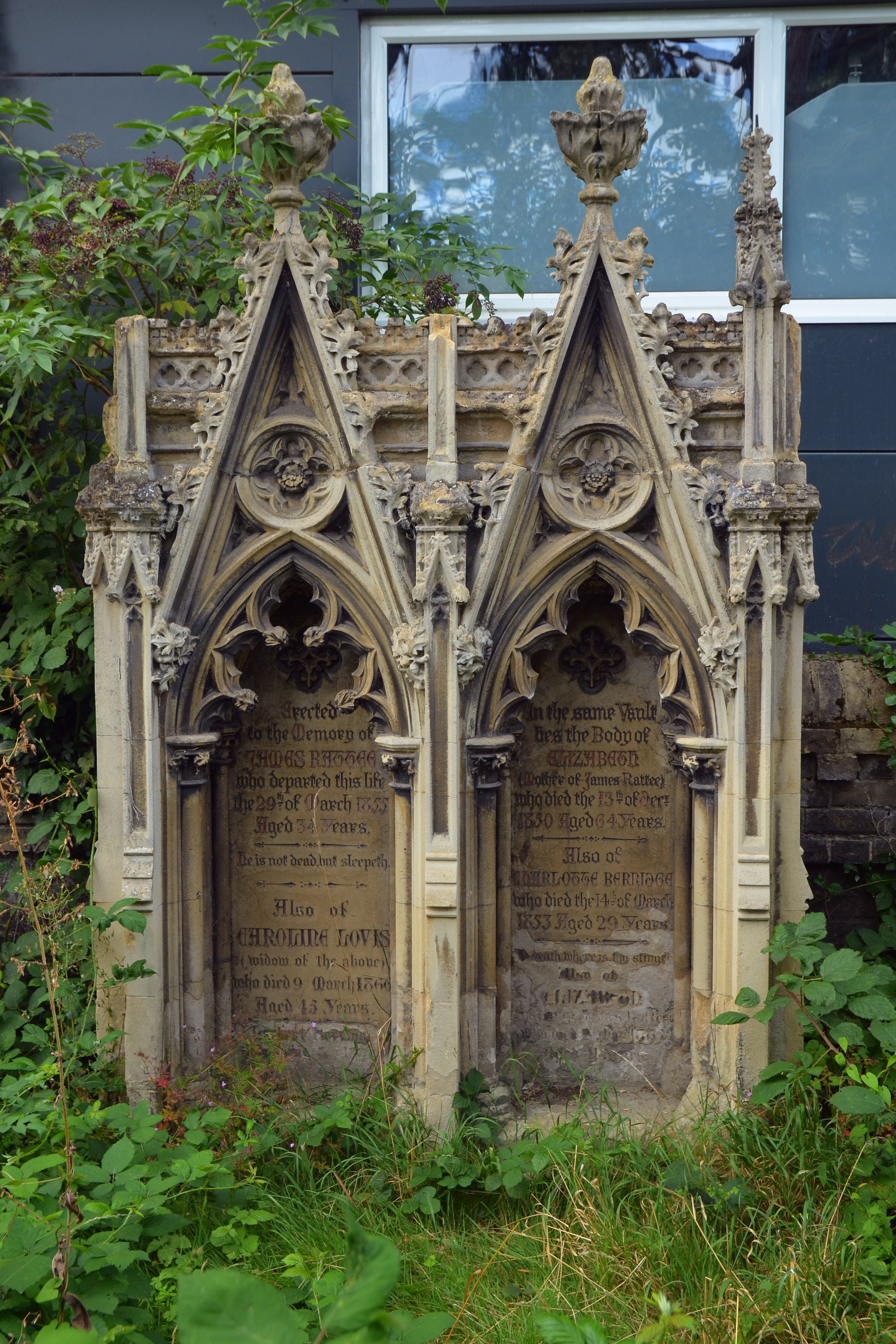
Grade II-listed tomb of James Rattee and his mother in Mill Road Cemetery, Cambridge

Biographies of some of those people interred in the cemetery and images of their graves or monuments can be found on the cemetery website.

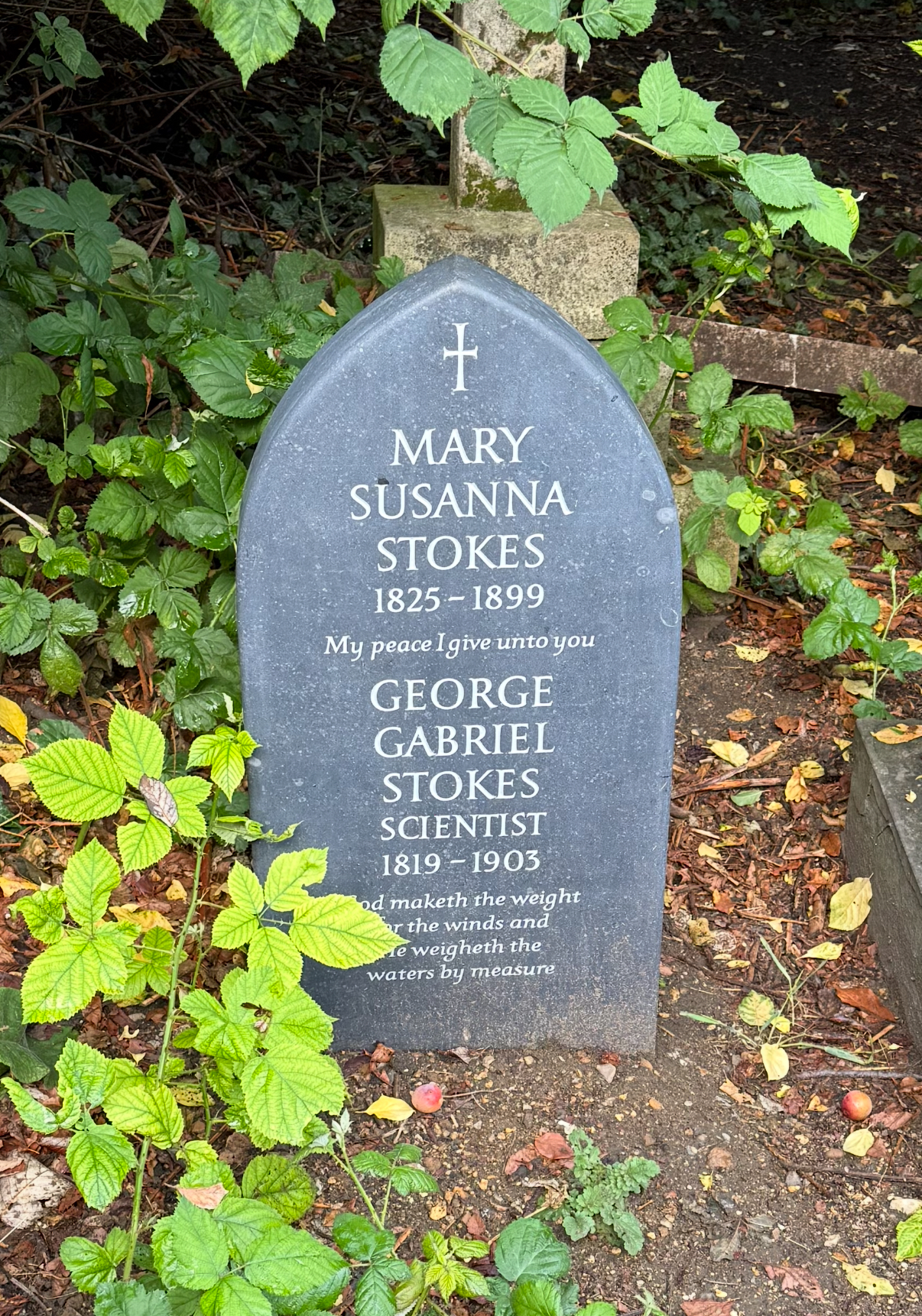
Slate replacement headstone for George Gabriel Stokes and his wife Mary Susanna

- John Barnard (1794–1878), amateur cricketer.
- William Magan Campion (1820–1896), mathematician and President of Queens' College, Cambridge
- Arthur Cayley (1821–1895), mathematician. The headstone is no longer standing. A wreath was placed at Cayley's grave, with a graveside address by Samuel Dickstein, at the 1912 International Congress of Mathematicians.
- James Challis (1803–1882), astronomer.
- John Willis Clark (1833–1910), university administrator and antiquary.
- Charles Henry Cooper (1808–1866), biographer and antiquary.
- Percival Frost (1817–1898), mathematician.
- George Garrett (1834–1897), organist and composer.
- Daniel Hayward, cricketer; father of Thomas Hayward
- Thomas Hayward (1835–1876), cricketer, son of Daniel Hayward
- Fenton Hort (1828–1892), theologian and bible scholar.
- George Murray Humphry (1820–1896), surgeon.
- Benjamin Hall Kennedy (1804–1889), classicist.
- Marion Kennedy (1836–1914), classical scholar.
- Samuel Savage Lewis (1836–1891), a librarian, antiquary and clergyman, and Agnes Smith Lewis (1843–1926), a novelist and Arabic and Syriac scholar.
- Daniel MacMillan (1813–1857), publisher.
- Eiríkr Magnússon (1833–1913), Icelandic scholar.
- James Rattee (1820–1855), woodcarver and mason.
- Emma Rolfe (1860–1874), murder victim.
- Robert Sayle (1816–1883), enterprising retailer
- John Robert Seeley (Sir) (1834–1895) Regius Professor of History, Cambridge University, and wife Mary Agnes Seeley (1839–1921),
- Sir George Stokes, 1st Baronet (1819–1903), FRS, physicist. His original gravestone "has now vanished from view". A replacement was installed in 2025.
- Isaac Todhunter (1820–1884), mathematician.
- Cordelia Whewell and Everina Frances (Lady Affleck), the wives of William Whewell (1794–1866) FRS, Master of Trinity College, Cambridge
