= Benjamin Hall Kennedy =

English scholar and schoolmaster

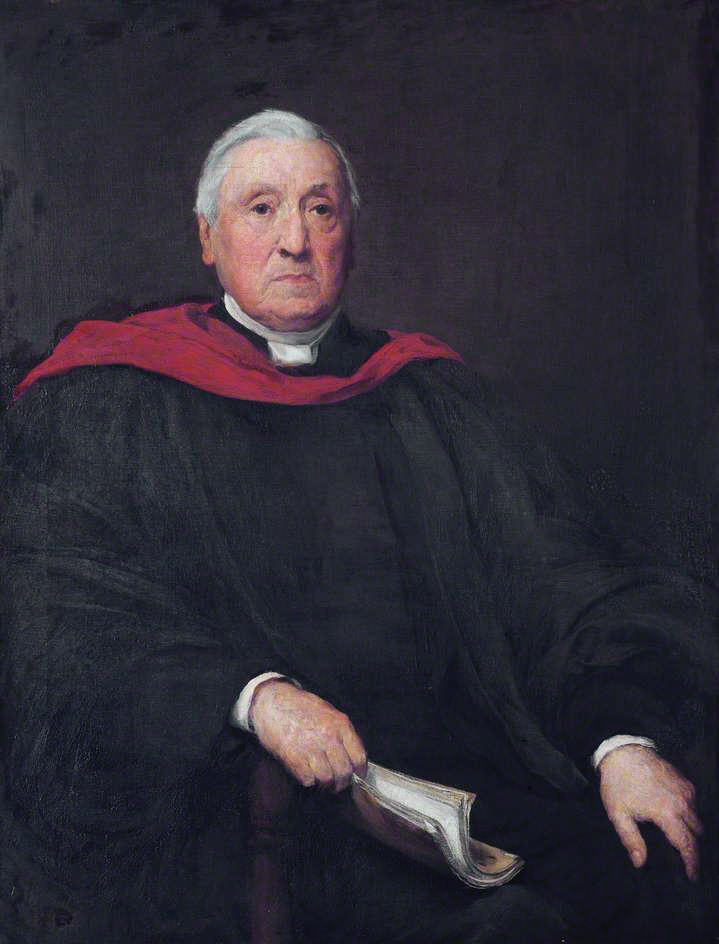
Benjamin Hall Kennedy (Walter William Ouless, 1883)

Benjamin Hall Kennedy (6 November 1804 – 6 April 1889) was an English scholar and schoolmaster, known for his work in the teaching of the Latin language. He was an active supporter of Newnham College and Girton College as Cambridge University colleges for women.

== Biography ==
He was born at Summer Hill, near Birmingham, the eldest son of Rann Kennedy (1772–1851), of a branch of the Ayrshire family which had settled in Staffordshire. Rann was a scholar and man of letters, several of whose sons rose to distinction. Benjamin was educated at King Edward's School, Birmingham, Shrewsbury School, and St John's College, Cambridge. He took frequent part in Cambridge Union debates and became president in 1825. In 1824 he was elected a member of the Cambridge Conversazione Society, better known as the Cambridge Apostles, and was a winner of a Browne medal. He was elected Fellow and lecturer in Classics at St John's College in 1828 and took Holy Orders the following year. In 1830, he became an assistant master at Harrow.

In 1836, he, his wife and his first child Charlotte Amy May Kennedy returned to Shrewsbury when he became headmaster. While they were there Charlotte was joined by Marion, Julia, Edith and Arthur. In 1841 he became prebendary of Lichfield, and after leaving Shrewsbury he was rector of West Felton, Shropshire, from 1866 to 1868. He remained as headmaster of Shrewsbury School until 1866, the 30 years being marked by successes for his pupils, chiefly in Classics. When he retired, a large collection was made, and this was used on new school buildings and on founding a Latin professorship at Cambridge. The first holders of the Kennedy Professor of Latin chair were both former pupils of Kennedy, H. A. J. Munro and J. E. B. Mayor.

In 1867, Kennedy was elected Regius Professor of Greek at Cambridge and canon of Ely Cathedral, serving in both posts until his death. From 1870 to 1880 he was a member of the committee for the revision of the New Testament. In 1870 he also became a member of the University Council.

He supported the access of women to university education and took a prominent part in the establishment of Newnham and Girton colleges. When Mary Paley and Amy Bulley were among the first women to take tripos examinations they did it in the Kennedys' drawing room. Paley described him as excitable, but he would sometimes doze whilst nominally invigilating. He was nicknamed "the purple boy". In politics, he had liberal sympathies. He died near Torquay and is buried in Mill Road Cemetery, Cambridge.

F. D. How included Kennedy in the 1904 book Six Great Schoolmasters.

== Writings ==
Kennedy wrote a number of classical and theological works, but he is most famous today for his primer of Latin grammar. This began as the Elementary Latin Primer (1843), which became the Public School Latin Primer (1866), the Public School Latin Grammar (1871), and finally the Revised Latin Primer (1888). The latter was further revised by J. F. Mountford in 1930. Another revision was edited by Gerrish Gray (first edition, 2008; second edition 2019), one version for a US audience and another for a UK audience. The medieval way of writing Latin noun tables, starting with the nominative and then proceeding to the genitive was used in England prior to Kennedy's Primer and is still widely used in America (e.g. in the Wheelock's Latin course). Kennedy changed the order of writing the noun endings so that the nominative was always followed by the vocative and accusative, in order to bring out more effectively the similarities between these cases in many nouns. Kennedy's Primer was so widely used and was so influential that this led to a permanent change in the way that Latin is taught in the UK and the British Commonwealth. Modern books such as the Cambridge Latin Course still follow this approach.

In 1913, there was a problem with the copyright on the Revised Latin Primer which had been published in 1888. His daughter Marion Kennedy, a Latin scholar, revealed that the book was written by herself, her sister Julia and two of her father's former students, G. H. Hallam and T. E. Page. It is unlikely that Kennedy had any hand in the revision of 1888, and the Shorter Latin Primer of the same year. The BBC Radio 4 programme in December 2018 Amo, Amas, Amusical, presented by Mary Beard, explained the background to the primer and the sisters' significant part in writing it, as well as the resistance to women's higher education at Cambridge and elsewhere during their lifetime.

Other works include:

- Christian Peaceableness: a Sermon (1839)
- An Elementary Grammar of the Latin Language (1847)
- Palaestra Latina; or, A Second Latin Reading-Book (1850)
- The Psalter in English Verse (1860)
- Elementary Greek Grammar (1862)
- The Public School Latin Grammar (1871; 4th ed., 1876)
- Studia Sophoclea, ... Being a Critical Examination of Lewis Campbell's edition of Sophocles (1874)
- Sophocles, Oedipus Tyrannus (2nd ed., 1885)
- Aristophanes, Birds (1874)
- Aeschylus, Agamemnon, with introduction, metrical translation and notes (2nd ed., 1882)
- A commentary on Virgil (3rd ed., 1881)
- Plato, Theaetetus, English translation (1881)

He contributed largely to the collection known as Sabrinae Corolla (John Bell, London, 1850), and published a collection of verse in Greek, Latin and English under the title of Between Whiles (2nd ed., 1882), with many autobiographical details.

== Family ==
His brother Charles Rann Kennedy was a barrister and wrote original works as well as translating and editing classical works. His younger brother The Rev. William James Kennedy (1814-1891) was a prominent educator, and the father of Lord Justice Sir William Rann Kennedy (1846–1915), a distinguished Cambridge scholar.
