= Caryl Micklem =

English minister

The Revd Thomas Caryl Micklem (1 August 1925 – 2 June 2003) was an English minister in the Congregational and United Reformed churches, hymn writer and religious broadcaster.

Micklem was born in Oxford into a family steeped in nonconformist tradition, and was educated at Mill Hill School and New College, Oxford. He was accredited a minister of the Congregational Church in 1949 and ordained in 1952. He served at congregations in Oundle, Banstead, Kensington United Reformed Church and St Columba's United Reformed Church, Oxford.

As a hymn writer, he was as skilled at composing tunes as he was in writing words. One of his best known hymns is "Give to me, Lord, a thankful heart", included in "New Church Praise" (1975) and "Rejoice and Sing" (1991). Micklem was on the board of compilers for both publications, chairing the music committee for the latter.

Micklem compiled and edited "Contemporary Prayers for Public Worship' (1967), "Contemporary Prayers for Church and School" (1975) and "More Contemporary Prayers" (1977). He served as Chairman of the Hymn Society of Great Britain and Ireland, and of the URC Musicians' Guild, as well as being on the Council of the Royal School of Church Music. He was Free Church Religious Advisor to ATV and a contributor to BBC Radio 4's Thought for the Day.
