= Charles Henry Cooper =

English antiquarian (1808–1866)

Charles Henry Cooper (20 March 1808 – 21 March 1866) was an English antiquarian.

== Life ==
Born at Marlow, Buckinghamshire, he was descended from a family formerly of Bray in Berkshire. He was privately educated in Reading. In 1826 he settled in Cambridge, and in 1836 was elected coroner of the borough. Four years later he qualified as a solicitor, and in time acquired an extensive practice, but he began to devote almost the whole of his time to antiquarian research — especially on the history of the University of Cambridge.

In 1849 he resigned as borough coroner when he was elected to the post of town clerk, which he retained till his death.

He is buried in the Mill Road Cemetery, Cambridge.

== Works ==
His earliest work, A New Guide to the University and Town of Cambridge, was published anonymously in 1831. The Annals of Cambridge followed (1842–1853), being a chronological history of the university and town from the earliest period to 1853. His most important work, the Athenæ Cantabrigienses (1858, 1861), a companion work to the famous Athenæ Oxonienses by Anthony Wood, contains biographical memoirs of the authors and other eminent men who were educated at the University of Cambridge from 1500 to 1609.

Cooper's other works are The Memorials of Cambridge, (1858–1866) and a Memoir of Margaret, Countess of Richmond and Derby (1874). He was a frequent contributor to Notes and Queries, The Gentleman's Magazine, and other antiquarian publications, and left a large collection of manuscript materials for a biographical history of Great Britain and Ireland. His eldest son, Thompson Cooper (1837-1904), was a journalist and Dictionary of National Biography contributor.
