= Fenner's =

Cricket ground in Cambridge, England

Coordinates: 52°12′00″N 0°07′55″E

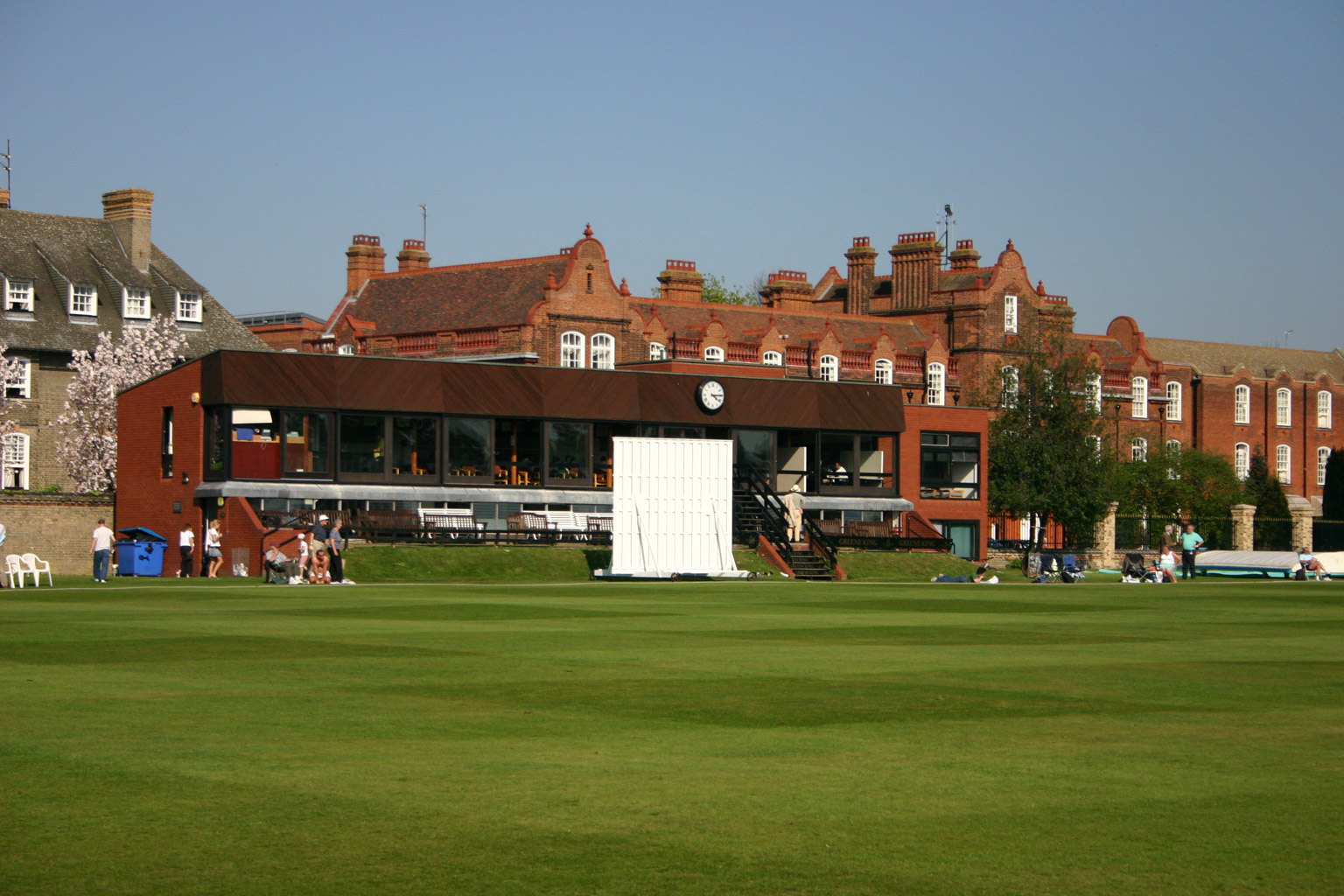
- Interactive map of Fenner's

Ground information
- Location: Cambridge, England
- Country: England
- Establishment: 1848
- Owner: Cambridge University Cricket & Athletics Company Ltd
- End names
- Pavilion End; Gresham Road End

Team information
| Cambridge University Cricket Club | (1848 – present) |
- As of 5 May 2023; Source: CricketArchive

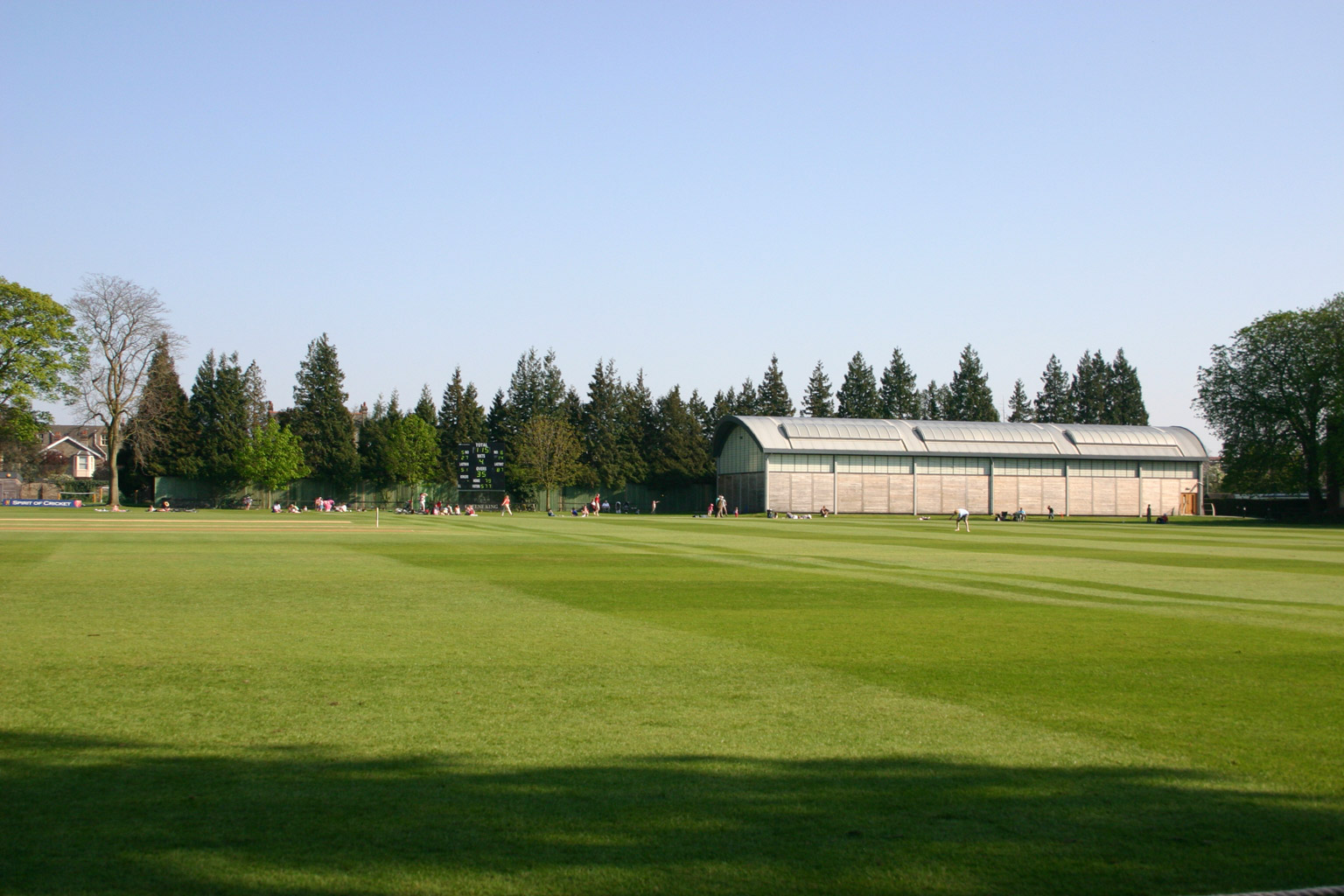
The indoor cricket school

Fenner's is Cambridge University Cricket Club's ground.

== History ==
Cambridge University Cricket Club had previously played at two grounds in Cambridge, the University Ground and Parker's Piece. In 1846, Francis Fenner leased a former cherry orchard from Gonville and Caius College for the purpose of constructing a cricket ground. In 1848 he sub-let the ground to Cambridge University Cricket Club. Fenner's first hosted first-class cricket in 1848, with Cambridge University playing against the Marylebone Cricket Club (MCC).

A 40-foot wooden pavilion, painted blue, with a slated roof had been erected by the 1856 season.

Since 1894, Fenner's has been owned by the Cambridge University Cricket and Athletic Company; a private limited company whose Members comprise the full members of Cambridge University Cricket Club and Cambridge University Athletics Club.

In August 2024, it was announced that the university had sold land on the edge of Fenner's to Hughes Hall. Subsequently, a petition was launched against development of that land.

== Facilities ==
As well as the cricket ground, there is a 3-lane indoor cricket school.

The groundsman pioneered the art of mowing grass in strips to create patterns, a technique now common in sports stadiums around the world.

== See also ==
- The Parks, Oxford § Cricket ground, where first-class cricket is played in Oxford
- University Ground, Barnwell, a former Cambridge University cricket ground
