= Kensington United Reformed Church =

Church

Coordinates: 51.498738°N 0.194800°W

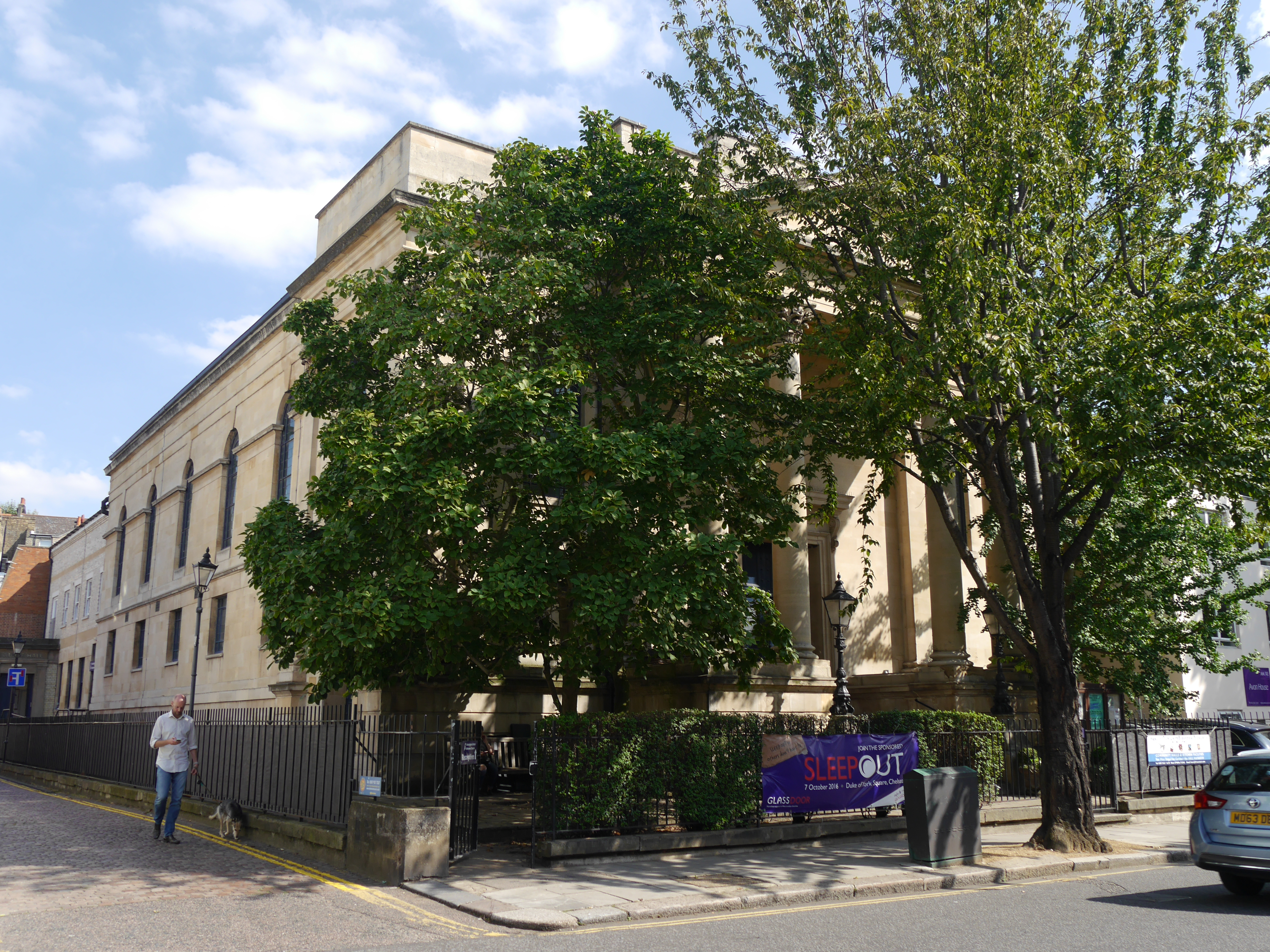
Kensington Congregational Chapel, London 2016

Kensington United Reformed Church is a Grade II listed church in Allen Street, Kensington, London, England.

It was built in 1854–55 as Kensington Congregational Chapel.

Since the Union of the Congregational and Presbyterian churches in England and Wales in 1972, the church has been a member of the United Reformed Church.

== Ministers ==
- Silvester Horne
- Caryl Micklem
