= Bunnell Lewis =

British archaeologist

Bunnell Lewis (26 July 1824 – 2 July 1908) was an English archaeologist, for many years an academic at Queen's College, Cork, Ireland.

== Life ==
Lewis was born on 26 July 1824 at 33 Spital Square, Middlesex (present-day London) to William Jones Lewis, a surgeon and deacon, and Mary Lewis (née Bunnell; born 1797). The eldest of two siblings, his father later married his maternal aunt, Elizabeth Bunnell, in 1827. From his father's second marriage, Lewis had 10 younger half-siblings including the librarian, antiquary and clergyman Samuel Savage Lewis. The maternal fourth great-grandson of the nonconformist Philip Henry, he was also the paternal grandson of the Welsh theologian and independent minister George Lewis (1763–1822).

He was educated under John Jackson, afterwards Bishop of London, at Islington proprietary school, and at University College, London, and after reading with Charles Rann Kennedy, he graduated B.A. in 1843 in the University of London, obtaining the university scholarship in classics. He became a fellow of University College in 1847, and proceeded M.A. in classics in 1849, taking the gold medal, then first awarded.

In the same year he was appointed professor of Latin at Queen's College, Cork, an appointment which he held until 1905. He laboured to make archaeology an integral part of university education, and with that end in view collected objects of art and antiquity for the museum of his college. At the foundation of the Queen's University of Ireland he took an active part in its administration, and held the office of examiner in Latin for four years.

Lewis early devoted his attention to archaeology, being elected Fellow of the Society of Antiquaries of London on 2 February 1860, and was in 1883 appointed foreign corresponding associate of the National Society of Antiquaries of France. In 1873–1874 he delivered courses of lectures on classical archaeology at University College in connection with the Slade School of Art. The inaugural lecture was published. His special study was the survival of Roman antiquities in various parts of Europe, and his inquiries took him during the summer recesses to Norway, Sweden, Denmark, Germany, France, Switzerland, Italy, Sicily, and Turkey. His discoveries of Roman antiquities, which shed much new light on the interpretation of Latin literature, were embodied in papers contributed between 1875 and 1907 to The Archaeological Journal.

Lewis died at his home in Cork on 2 July 1908, and was buried at Cork. He bequeathed to University College, London, his classical and archaeological library and £1000 for a Bunnell Lewis Prize for proficiency in original Latin verse and in translations from Latin and Greek.

== Family ==
He married in 1855 Jane (died 1867), second daughter of the Rev. John Whitley, D.D., chancellor of Killaloe; he married in 1871 Louise Emily (died 1882), daughter of Admiral Bowes-Watson of Cambridge. He left no children.

== Publications ==
Besides his archaeological papers and contributions to the second (revised) edition of William Smith's Latin Dictionary, he published A Letter to J. Robson, Esq., on the Slade Professorships of Fine Art (1869), and Remarks on Ivory Cabinets in the Possession of Wickham Flowor, Esq., (1871).
