= Julia Kennedy =

British classical scholar

- Born: 23 December 1839; Shrewsbury, England
- Died: 9 December 1916 (aged 76); Cambridge, England
- Occupation: Classicist
- Relatives: Marion Kennedy (sister)

Julia Elizabeth "Poppy" Kennedy (23 December 1839 – 9 December 1916) was a British classical scholar. She was a supporter of women's suffrage and higher education for women.

== Life ==
Julia, the daughter of Janet and Benjamin Hall Kennedy, was born in 1839 in Shrewsbury. She had four siblings: Charlotte Amy May Kennedy (1832‒95), Marion Kennedy (1836‒1914), Edith Janet Kennedy (1842‒1922), and Arthur Herbert Kennedy (1846‒85). The Kennedy family moved to Cambridge in 1867, when Benjamin took up the Regius Chair in Greek at the University of Cambridge.

Julia was taught philology under Walter William Skeat, and was described by John E. B. Mayor in 1871 as "an intelligent member of his Latin class for ladies". In 1877 she passed the Cambridge Higher Local Examinations.

In the 1880s she gave lectures on Anglo-Saxon at Girton College. In 1890 she was elected to membership of the Cambridge Philological Society.

She was active in the women's suffrage movement. In 1908, Julia Kennedy and Rosamund Philpott were the first women to stand for election in the Cambridge Town Council elections.

== Kennedy's Revised Latin Primer ==
Kennedy's Latin Grammar was first published as the Public School Latin Primer in 1866, based on an earlier Latinae Grammaticae Curriculum, or a Progressive Grammar of the Latin Language written by Benjamin Hall Kennedy. A revised version of the Public School Latin Primer was published in 1888 as the Revised Latin Primer under Benjamin Hall Kennedy's name. However, the revised version was not written by Benjamin Kennedy himself, but Julia and Marion Kennedy: Julia wrote the philological introduction, and her sister Marion had provided the examples. Letters from Julia to the publisher concerning issues related to copyright raised in 1914 demonstrate the extent of their involvement, and highlight Benjamin Kennedy's reluctance to produce a revised version: "My father was only prepared at first for a comparatively slight revision...it was not easy to make him see the extent and far reaching quality of the alterations which were called for, both by the rapid growth of comparative philology and by the newer methods of teaching." Kennedy's Revised Latin Primer soon became the standard Latin Grammar in England, and is still in use.

Kennedy's letters to the publishers of the Revised Latin Primer are part of the Longman Group archive held at the University of Reading. A radio musical about the role of Julia and Marion Kennedy in writing the Revised Latin Primer and the fight for women's access to higher education was broadcast on BBC Radio 4 in 2019, narrated by Mary Beard.
