= Vedi (altar) =

Vedic sacrificial altar

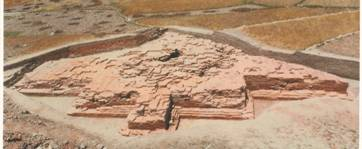
Falcon-shaped vedi excavated from Purola, Uttarkashi; likely belonging to the Kuninda period (150 BCE - 250 CE).

Vedi (Sanskrit: वेदी, romanized: Vedī, lit. 'altar') is the sacrificial altar in the Vedic religion. Such altars were an elevated outdoor enclosure, generally strewed with Kusha grass, and having receptacles for the sacrificial fire; it was of various shapes, but usually narrow in the middle.

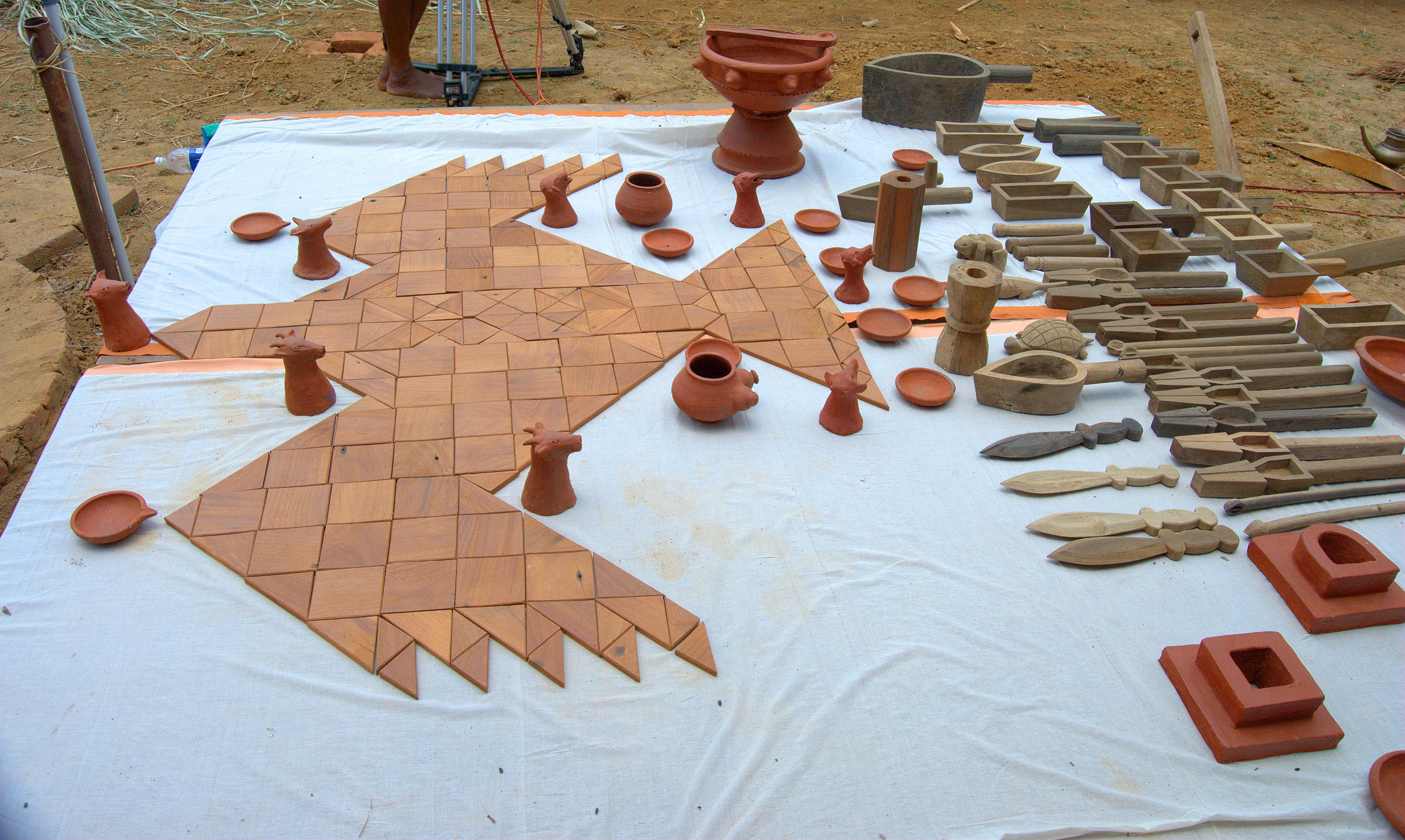
Modern replica of utensils and vedi used for Agnicayana, an elaborate Śrauta ritual originating from the Kuru kingdom, c. 1000 BCE

They were used in various types of Yajna rituals, of which the lengthiest was the agnicayana, lasting twelve days. In Vedic times, offerings, often including animals, were burnt in the fire, and fully consumed by it. This contrasts with modern Hindu offerings to gods, which are all vegetable, and are preserved to be consumed by the devotees (which was also the case in other religions, such as ancient Greek religion).

Fire altars remain part of the rituals in some Hindu festivals and rites of passage; in particular circling around a sacred fire (saptapadi) remains an essential part of Hindu weddings.

Although Agni, the Vedic god of fire, has an important place in the mandala setting out the plan in Hindu temple architecture, in the south-east part of the temple, fire altars are not now a normal part of regular Hindu temple rituals. Modern fire sacrifices are covered at Homa rituals.

== Types ==
As deduced from descriptions in ancient texts, the types of vedi were:

- mahavedi, the great or entire altar
- uttaravedi, the northern altar made for the sacred fire (agnyayatana)
- dhishnya, a sort of subordinate or side-altar, generally a heap of earth covered with sand on which the fire is placed
- drona, an altar shaped like a trough (Shulbas. 3.216)
- adhvaradhishnya, a second altar at the Soma sacrifice

The uttaravedi was in the shape of a falcon (alajacita 'piled up in the shape of the bird Alaja'), and was piled up with bricks in the Agnicayana ritual.

Vedic altars are described in the circum-Vedic texts dealing with Kalpa (the proper performance of sacrifice), notably the Satapatha Brahmana, and the Sulbasutras say that the Rigveda corresponds to an altar of mantras.

Fire altars are already mentioned in the Rigveda. According to Taittiriya Samhita 5.2.3., they are made of twenty-one bricks.

In ŚBM 10.4.3.14-20, the altar is made of 396 (360 + 36) yajusmati (special) bricks, and of 10,800 lokamprna (ordinary) bricks. 10,701 lokamprna bricks belong to the ahavaniya altar, 78 to the dhisnya hearths and 21 to the garhapatya. Around the altar are 360 parisrita stones (261 around ahavaniya, 78 around dhisnya, 21 around garhapatya).

ŚBM 10.3.1. describes that the altar is symbolically built with gayatri (24 syllables), usnih (breath, 28 syllables), pankti (mind, 40 syllables), tristubh (ear, 44 syllables), jagati (awakening) (48 syllables) and generative breath. The gayatri altar's height is to the knees, the tristubh's to the navel and the jagati's to a man's height.

== Agnicayana ==
Layer	Number of yajusmati bricks in SB
5	138
4	47
3	71
2	41
1	98

In the Agnicayana ritual, the mahavedi (great altar) has a length of 24 prakrama in the east, 30 in the west and 36 in the north and south. Inside the mahavedi, an altar is placed. In the smaller ritual space to the west of the mahavedi (pracinavamsa, pragvamsa), three altars are placed: the garhapatya (earth, west), ahavaniya (sky, east) and daksinagni (or anvaharyapacana, southwest). The round garhapatya and the square ahavaniya have the same area. The Squaring the circle problem was also investigated because of such ritualistic considerations. The ahavaniya altar has five layers (citi), representing earth, space and the sky.

== Archaeology ==
The earliest falcon-shaped vedi are dated to the period of Kuninda Kingdom, between 2nd century BCE and 2nd century CE, examples being discovered at Purola, Uttarkashi, and Kosambi, Kaushambi.

== See also ==
- Agiary
- Yajna
