= Historical Vedic religion =

1500–500 BCE Indo-Aryan religious practices of India

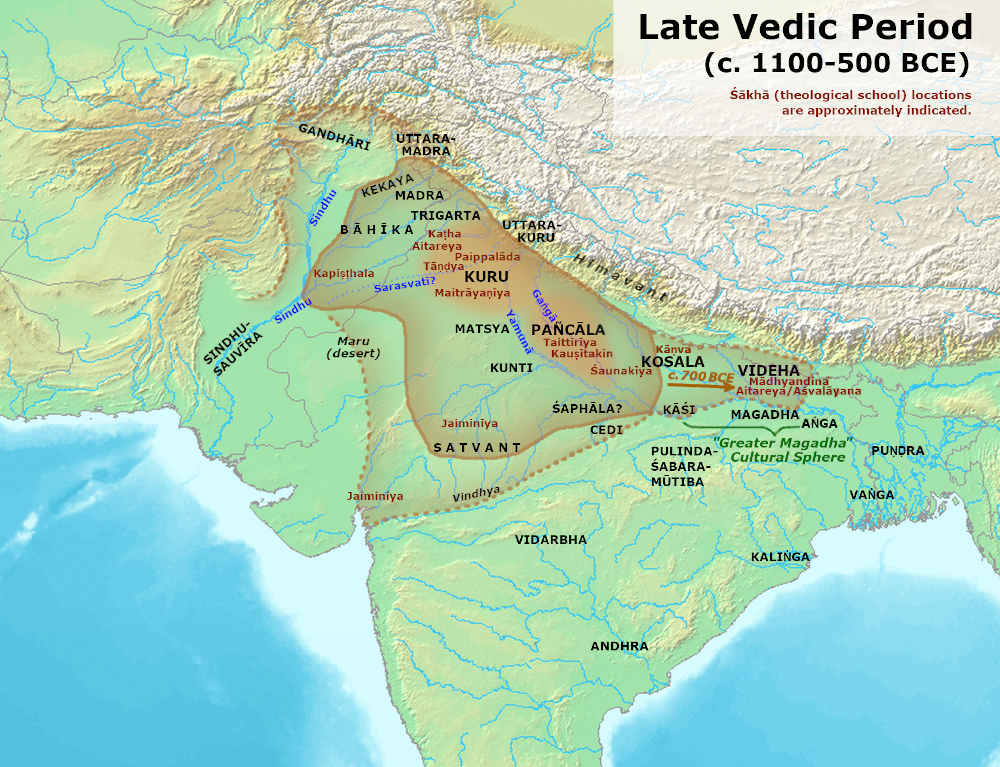
The spread of the Vedic culture in the late Vedic period. Aryavarta was limited to northwest India and the western Ganges plain, while Greater Magadha in the east was occupied by non-Vedic Indo-Aryans. The location of shakhas is labeled in maroon.

The historical Vedic religion, also called Vedism or Brahmanism, and sometimes ancient Hinduism or Vedic Hinduism, (Note: Scholars such as Jan Gonda have used the term ancient Hinduism, distinguishing it from "recent Hinduism". Jamison & Witzel (1992, p. 3) use the term "Vedic Hinduism," but state:"... to call this period Vedic Hinduism is a contradictio in terminis since Vedic religion is very different from what we generally call Hindu religion – at least as much as Old Hebrew religion is from medieval and modern Christian religion. However, Vedic religion is treatable as a predecessor of Hinduism". Michaels (2004, p. 38) also emphasizes the differences: "The legacy of the Vedic religion in Hinduism is generally overestimated. The influence of the mythology is indeed great, but the religious terminology changed considerably: all the key terms of Hinduism either do not exist in Vedic or have a completely different meaning. The religion of the Veda does not know the ethicised migration of the soul with retribution for acts (karma), the cyclical destruction of the world, or the idea of salvation during one's lifetime (jivanmukti; moksa; nirvana); the idea of the world as illusion (maya) must have gone against the grain of ancient India, and an omnipotent creator god emerges only in the late hymns of the rgveda. Nor did the Vedic religion know a caste system, the burning of widows, the ban on remarriage, images of gods and temples, Puja worship, Yoga, pilgrimages, vegetarianism, the holiness of cows, the doctrine of stages of life (asrama), or knew them only at their inception. Thus, it is justified to see a turning point between the Vedic religion and Hindu religions." See also Halbfass (1991, pp. 1–2) The Encyclopædia Britannica explains that from the Vedic religion emerged Brahmanism, a religious tradition of ancient India. It states, "Brahmanism emphasized the rites performed by, and the status of, the Brahman, or priestly, class as well as speculation about Brahman (the Absolute reality) as theorized in the Upanishads (speculative philosophical texts that are considered to be part of the Vedas, or scriptures)." From Brahmanism developed Hinduism, when it was synthesized, around the start of the Common Era, with the non-Vedic Indo-Aryan religious heritage of the eastern Ganges plain and with local religious traditions; see Witzel 1995; Hiltebeitel 2002; Samuel 2010; Welbon 2004; Bronkhorst 2007.) constituted the religious ideas and practices prevalent amongst some of the Indo-Aryan peoples of the northwest Indian subcontinent (Punjab and the western Ganges plain) during the Vedic period (c. 1500–500 BCE). These ideas and practices are found in the Vedic texts, and some Vedic rituals are still practised today. The Vedic religion is one of the major traditions which shaped modern Hinduism, though present-day Hinduism is significantly different from the historical Vedic religion.

The Vedic religion has roots in the Indo-Iranian culture and religion of the Sintashta (c. 2200–1750 BCE) and Andronovo (c. 2000–1150 BCE) cultures of Eurasian Steppe. (Note: The Indo-Aryans were pastoralists who migrated into north-western India after the collapse of the Indus Valley civilization, bringing with them their language and religion. They were closely related to the Indo-Aryans who founded Mitanni kingdom in northern Syria (c.1500–1300 BCE). Both groups were rooted in the Andronovo-culture in the Bactria–Margiana era, in present northern Afghanistan, and related to the Indo-Iranians, from which they split off around 1800–1600 BCE. Their roots go back further to the Sintashta culture, with funeral sacrifices which show close parallels to the sacrificial funeral rites of the Rig Veda. The immigrations consisted probably of small groups of people. Kenoyer (1998) notes that "there is no archaeological or biological evidence for invasions or mass migrations into the Indus Valley between the end of the Harappan phase, about 1900 B.C. and the beginning of the Early Historic period around 600 B.C." For an overview of the current relevant research, see the following references.) This Indo-Iranian religion borrowed "distinctive religious beliefs and practices" (Note: BMAC-influences: Beckwith (2011, p. 32): "Although the Indo-Europeans settled in new lands, in some cases (such as Greece) evidently by conquest, they did not always dominate the local people in the beginning. Instead, they often served the local peoples as mercenary warriors, or came under their domination in general. In either case, the Indo-European migrants–who were mostly men–married local women and, by mixing with them, developed their distinctive creole dialect features. The most influential of the new dialects was Proto-Indo-Iranian, the speakers of which appear to have been influenced linguistically by a non-Indo-European people from whom the Indo-Iranians borrowed their distinctive religious beliefs and practices. The locus of this convergence is increasingly thought to have been the area of the advanced, non-Indo-European-speaking Bactria–Margiana Culture's centred on what is now northwestern Afghanistan and southern Turkmenistan. The other Indo-Europeans developed different dialects and beliefs under the influence of other non-Indo-European languages and cultures."; Anthony (2007, pp. 454–455) states that at least 383 non-Indo-European words were borrowed from this culture, including the god Indra and the ritual drink Soma, which was "probably borrowed from the BMAC religion."; Anthony (2007, p. 454): "Many of the qualities of the Indo-Iranian god of might/victory, Verethraghna, were transferred to the adopted god Indra, who became the central deity of the developing Old Indic culture. Indra was the subject of 250 hymns, a quarter of the Rigveda. He was associated more than any other deity with Soma, a stimulant drug (perhaps derived from Ephedra) probably borrowed from the BMAC religion. His rise to prominence was a peculiar trait of the Old Indic speakers.") from the non-Indo-Aryan Bactria–Margiana culture (BMAC; 2250–1700 BCE) of south of Central Asia, when pastoral Indo-Aryan tribes stayed there as a separate people in the early 2nd millennium BCE. From the BMAC, Indo-Aryan tribes migrated to the northwestern region of the Indian subcontinent, and the Vedic religion developed there during the early Vedic period (c. 1500–1100 BCE) as a variant of Indo-Aryan religion, influenced by the remnants of the late Indus Valley Civilisation (2600–1900 BCE).

During the late Vedic period (c. 1100–500 BCE), Brahmanism developed out of the Vedic religion as an ideology of the Kuru-Panchala realm which expanded into a wider area after the demise of the Kuru-Pancala realm and the domination of the non-Vedic Magadha cultural sphere. Brahmanism was one of the major influences that shaped contemporary Hinduism, when it was synthesized with the non-Vedic Indo-Aryan religious heritage of the eastern Ganges plain (which also gave rise to Buddhism and Jainism) and with local religious traditions.

Specific rituals and sacrifices of the Vedic religion include, among others: the Soma rituals; fire rituals involving oblations (havir); and the Ashvamedha (horse sacrifice). The rites of grave burials as well as cremation are seen since the Rigvedic period. Deities emphasized in the Vedic religion include Dyaus, Indra, Agni, Rudra and Varuna, and important ethical concepts include satya and ṛta.

== Terminology ==
=== Vedism and Brahmanism ===
Vedism refers to the oldest form of the Vedic religion, when Indo-Aryans entered into the valley of the Indus River in multiple waves during the 2nd millennium BCE. Brahmanism refers to the further developed form of the late Vedic period which took shape at the Ganges basin around c. 1000 BCE. (Note: See Witzel 1995 for an elaborate description of the religious and socio-political development of the late Vedic society) According to Heesterman, "It is loosely known as Brahmanism because of the religious and legal importance it places on the brāhmaṇa (priestly) class of society." During the late Vedic period, the Brahmanas and early Upanishads were composed. Both Vedism and Brahmanism regard the Veda as sacred, but Brahmanism is more inclusive, incorporating doctrines and themes beyond the Vedas with practices like temple worship, puja, meditation, renunciation, vegetarianism, the role of the guru, and other non-Vedic elements important to Hindu religious life.

=== Ancient Hinduism and Vedic Hinduism ===
The terms ancient Hinduism and Vedic Hinduism have also been used when referring to the ancient Vedic religion.

According to Heinrich von Stietencron, in 19th-century western publications, the Vedic religion was believed to be different from and unrelated to Hinduism. Instead, Hinduism was thought to be linked to the Hindu epics and the Puranas through sects based on purohita, tantras and bhakti. In response to western colonialism and (Protestant) proselytizing, Hindu reform movements like the Brahmo Samaj and the Neo-Vedanta in the late 19th and early 20th century rejected the 'superstitions' of Puranic Hinduism, which in their view had deviated from the Vedic heritage, instead propagating a return to the Vedas and to restore an "imagined" original, rational and monotheistic ancient Hinduism with an equal standing as Protestant Christianity.

In the 20th century, the neo-Hindu emphasis on Vedic roots, and a better understanding of the Vedic religion and its shared heritage and theology with contemporary Hinduism, led scholars to view the historical Vedic religion as ancestral to modern Hinduism. The historical Vedic religion is now generally accepted to be a predecessor of modern Hinduism, but they are not the same because the textual evidence suggests significant differences between the two. These include the belief in an afterlife instead of the later developed reincarnation and samsāra concepts. Nevertheless, while "it is usually taught that the beginnings of historical Hinduism date from around the beginning of the Common Era," when "the key tendencies, the crucial elements that would be encompassed in Hindu traditions, collectively came together," some scholars have come to view the term "Hinduism" as encompassing Vedism and Brahmanism, in addition to the recent synthesis.

== Origins and development ==
=== Indo-Aryan Vedic religion ===
The Vedic religion refers to the religious beliefs of some Vedic Indo-Aryan tribes, the aryas, (Note: Michaels: "They called themselves arya ('Aryans', literally 'the hospitable', from the Vedic arya, 'homey, the hospitable') but even in the Rgveda, arya denotes a cultural and linguistic boundary and not only a racial one.") who migrated into the Indus River valley region of the Indian subcontinent after the collapse of the Indus Valley Civilisation. The Vedic religion, and subsequent Brahmanism, centre on the myths and ritual ideologies of the Vedas, as distinguished from Agamic, Tantric and sectarian forms of Indian religion, which take recourse to the authority of non-Vedic textual sources. The Vedic religion is described in the Vedas and associated with voluminous Vedic literature, including the early Upanishads, preserved into the modern times by the different priestly schools. The religion existed in the western Ganges plain in the early Vedic period from c. 1500–1100 BCE, (Note: There is no exact dating possible for the beginning of the Vedic period. Witzel mentions a range between 1900 and 1400 BCE. Flood (1996) mentions 1500 BCE.) and developed into Brahmanism in the late Vedic period (c. 1100–500 BCE). The eastern Ganges plain was dominated by another Indo-Aryan complex, which rejected the later Brahmanical ideology and gave rise to Jainism and Buddhism, and the Maurya Empire.

==== Indo-European roots and syncreticism ====
The Indo-Aryans were speakers of a branch of the Indo-European language family which originated in the Sintashta culture and further developed into the Andronovo culture, which in turn developed out of the Kurgan culture of the Central Asian steppes. (Note: Some writers and archaeologists have opposed the notion of a migration of Indo-Aryans into India, due to a lack of archaeological evidence and signs of cultural continuity, hypothesizing instead a slow process of acculturation or transformation. According to Upinder Singh, "The original homeland of the Indo-Europeans and Indo-Aryans is the subject of continuing debate among philologists, linguists, historians, archaeologists, and others. The dominant view is that the Indo-Aryans came to the subcontinent as invaders. Another view, advocated mainly by some Indian scholars, is that they were indigenous to the subcontinent." Edwin Bryant used the term "Indo-Aryan controversy" for an oversight of the Indo-Aryan migration theory, and some of its opponents. Mallory and Adams note that two types of models "enjoy significant international currency", namely the Anatolian hypothesis, and a migration out of the Eurasian steppes. Linguistic and archaeological data clearly show a cultural change after 1750 BCE, with the linguistic and religious data clearly showing links with Indo-European languages and religion. According to Singh, "The dominant view is that the Indo-Aryans came to the subcontinent as immigrants." An overview of the "Indigenist position" can be obtained from Bryant & Patton (2005). See also the article Indigenous Aryans) The commonly proposed period of earlier Vedic age is dated back to the 2nd millennium BCE.

The Vedic beliefs and practices of the pre-classical era were closely related to the hypothesized Proto-Indo-European religion, (Note: See Kuzʹmina (2007), The Origin of the Indo-Iranians, p. 339, for an overview of publications up to 1997 on this subject.) and shows relations with rituals from the Andronovo culture, from which the Indo-Aryan people descended. According to Anthony, the Old Indic religion probably emerged among Indo-European immigrants in the contact zone between the Zeravshan River (present-day Uzbekistan) and (present-day) Iran. It was "a syncretic mixture of old Central Asian and new Indo-European elements" which borrowed "distinctive religious beliefs and practices" from the Bactria–Margiana culture (BMAC). This syncretic influence is supported by at least 383 non-Indo-European words that were borrowed from this culture, including the god Indra and the ritual drink soma. According to Anthony,

Many of the qualities of the Indo-Iranian god of might/victory, Verethraghna, were transferred to the adopted god Indra, who became the central deity of the developing Old Indic culture. Indra was the subject of 250 hymns, a quarter of the Rig Veda. He was associated more than any other deity with Soma, a stimulant drug (perhaps derived from Ephedra) probably borrowed from the BMAC religion. His rise to prominence was a peculiar trait of the Old Indic speakers.

The oldest inscriptions in Old Indic, the language of the Rig Veda, are found in northern Syria, the location of the Mitanni kingdom. The Mitanni kings took Old Indic throne names, and Old Indic technical terms were used for horse-riding and chariot-driving. The Old Indic term ṛta, meaning "cosmic order and truth", the central concept of the Rig Veda, was also employed in the Mitanni kingdom. Old Indic gods, including Indra, were also known in the Mitanni kingdom.

==== South Asian influences ====
The Vedic religion was the product of "a composite of the Indo-Aryan and Harappan cultures and civilizations". White (2003) cites three other scholars who "have emphatically demonstrated" that Vedic religion is partially derived from the Indus Valley civilization.

It is unclear if the theory in diverse Vedic texts actually reflects the folk practices, iconography, and other practical aspects of the Vedic religion. The Vedic religion changed when Indo-Aryan people migrated into the Gangetic Plain after c. 1100 BCE and became settled farmers, further syncretizing with the native cultures of northern India. The evidence suggests that the Vedic religion evolved in "two superficially contradictory directions", namely an ever more "elaborate, expensive, and specialized system of rituals", which survives in the present-day srauta-ritual, and "abstraction and internalization of the principles underlying ritual and cosmic speculation" within oneself, akin to the Jain and Buddhist tradition.

Aspects of the historical Vedic religion still continue in modern times. For instance, the Nambudiri Brahmins continue the ancient Śrauta rituals, and the complex Vedic rituals of Śrauta are practised in Kerala and coastal Andhra. The Kalash people residing in northwest Pakistan also continue to practise a form of the ancient Vedic religion. (Note: Up to the late 19th century, the Nuristanis of Afghanistan observed a primitive form of Hinduism until they were forcibly converted to Islam under the rule of Abdur Rahman Khan. However, aspects of the historical Vedic religion survived in other corners of the Indian subcontinent, such as Kerala, where the Nambudiri Brahmins continue the ancient Śrauta rituals. The Kalash people residing in northwest Pakistan also continue to practise a form of the ancient Vedic religion.) It has also been suggested by Michael Witzel that Shinto, the native religion of Japan, contains some influences from the ancient Vedic religion.

=== Brahmanism ===
==== Historical Brahmanism ====
Brahmanism, also called Brahminism or Brahmanical Hinduism, developed out of the Vedic religion, incorporating non-Vedic religious ideas, and expanding to a region stretching from the northwest Indian subcontinent to the Ganges valley. Brahmanism included the Vedic corpus, but also post-Vedic texts such as the Dharmasutras and Dharmaśāstras, which gave prominence to the priestly (Brahmin) caste of the society, Heesterman also mentions the post-Vedic Smriti (Puranas and the Epics), which are also incorporated in the later Smarta tradition. The emphasis on ritual and the dominant position of Brahmins developed as an ideology in the Kuru-Pancala realm, and expanded over a wider area after the demise of the Kuru-Pancala kingdom and its incorporation into the Magadha-based empires. It co-existed with local religions, such as the Yaksha cults.

The word Brahmanism was coined by Gonçalo Fernandes Trancoso (1520–1596) in the 16th century. Historically, and still by some modern authors, the word 'Brahmanism' was used in English to refer to the Hindu religion, treating the term Brahmanism as synonymous with Hinduism, and using it interchangeably. Michael S. Allen criticises the use of "Brahminism" for the "greater Vedic tradition", arguing that it obscures the contribution of non-Brahmins to the tradition. In the 18th and 19th centuries, Brahminism was the most common term used in English for Hinduism. Brahmanism gave importance to Absolute Reality (Brahman) speculations in the early Upanishads, as these terms are etymologically linked, which developed from post-Vedic ideas during the late Vedic era. The concept of Brahman is posited as that which existed before the creation of the universe, which constitutes all of existence thereafter, and into which the universe will dissolve, followed by similar endless creation-maintenance-destruction cycles. (Note: For the metaphysical concept of Brahman, see: Lipner, Julius (2012). Hindus: Their Religious Beliefs and Practices. Routledge. pp. 251–252, 283, 366–369. ISBN 978-1-135-24061-5; Perrett, Roy W. (1998). Hindu Ethics: A Philosophical Study. University of Hawaii Press. pp. 53–54. ISBN 978-0-8248-2085-5.)

The post-Vedic period of the Second Urbanisation saw a decline of Brahmanism. With the growth of political entities, which threatened the income and patronage of the rural Brahmins including; the Shramanic movement, the conquests of eastern empires from Magadha including the Nanda Empire and the Mauryan Empire, and also invasions and foreign rule of the northwestern Indian subcontinent which brought in new political entities. This was overcome by providing new services and incorporating the non-Vedic Indo-Aryan religious heritage of the eastern Gangetic plain and local religious traditions, giving rise to contemporary Hinduism. This "new Brahmanism" appealed to rulers, who were attracted to the supernatural powers and the practical advice Brahmins could provide, and resulted in a resurgence of Brahmanical influence, dominating Indian society since the classical Age of Hinduism in the early centuries CE.

==== Modern usage ====
Nowadays, the term Brahmanism, used interchangeably with Brahminism, is used in several ways. It denotes the specific Brahmanical rituals and worldview as preserved in the Śrauta ritual, as distinct from the wide range of popular cultic activity with little connection with them. The term is also used in sociopolitical sense in anti-caste discourse; following the outline of the 19th century critique of "Brahminism". B. R. Ambedkar and Hindu reformists structured their criticism in opposition to the dominant social position Brahmin had acquired during the time of British rule.

== Textual history ==
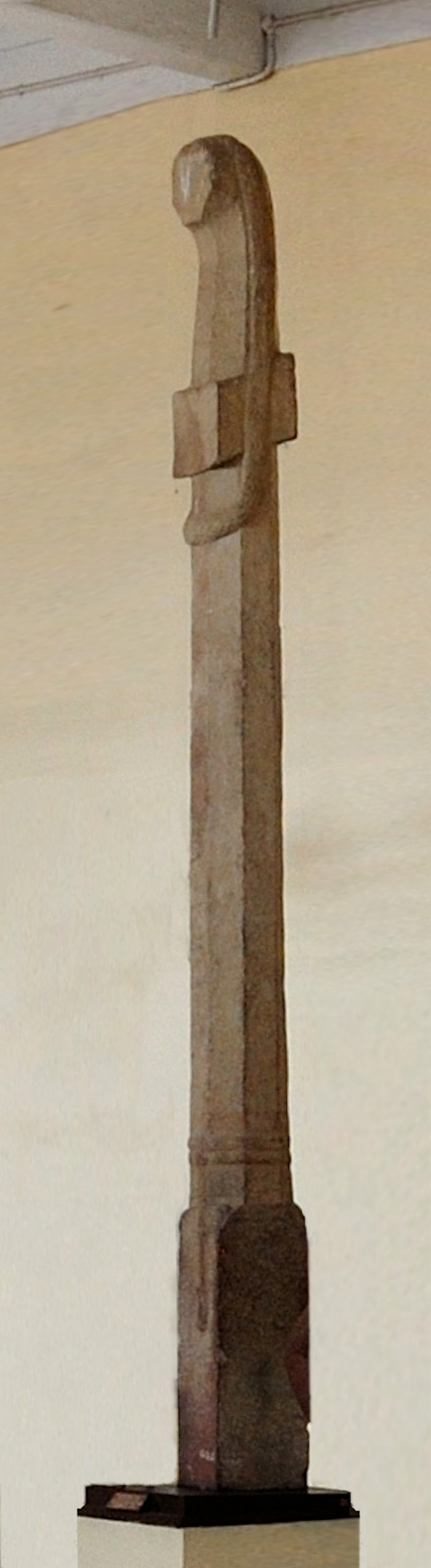
A Yupa sacrificial post of the time of Vasishka, 3rd century CE. Isapur, near Mathura. Mathura Museum.

Texts dating to the Vedic period, composed in Vedic Sanskrit, are mainly the four Vedic Samhitas, but the Brahmanas, Aranyakas, and some of the older Upanishads (Note: Upanishads thought to date from the Vedic period are Bṛhadāraṇyaka, Chāndogya, Jaiminiya Upanishad Brahmana.) are also placed in this period. Michael Witzel states that the Vedic canon of texts consists of all the texts that 'originated in and were used by' the Vedic schools. The Vedas record the liturgy connected with the rituals and sacrifices. The Vedas were initially preserved exclusively via oral transmission with the earliest recorded manuscript found in Nepal in the 11th-century. These texts are also considered as a part of the scripture of contemporary Hinduism.

Who really knows?
Who will here proclaim it?
Whence was it produced? Whence is this creation?
The gods came afterwards, with the creation of this universe.
Who then knows whence it has arisen?
— Nasadiya Sukta, Rig Veda, 10:129-6

== Characteristics ==
The idea of reincarnation, or saṃsāra, is not mentioned in the early layers of the historic Vedic religion texts such as the Rigveda. The later layers of the Rigveda do mention ideas that suggest an approach towards the idea of rebirth, according to Ranade.

The early layers of the Vedas do not mention the doctrine of Karma and rebirth, but mention the belief in an afterlife. According to Sayers, these earliest layers of the Vedic literature show ancestor worship and rites such as sraddha (offering food to the ancestors). The later Vedic texts, such as the Aranyakas and the Upanisads show a different soteriology based on reincarnation, they show little concern with ancestor rites, and they begin to philosophically interpret the earlier rituals. The idea of reincarnation and karma have roots in the Upanishads of the late Vedic period, predating the Buddha and the Mahavira. Similarly, the later layers of the Vedic literature such as the Brihadaranyaka Upanishad (c. 800 BCE) – such as in section 4.4 – discuss the earliest versions of the Karma doctrine as well as causality.

The ancient Vedic religion lacked the belief in reincarnation and concepts such as Saṃsāra or Nirvana. It was a complex animistic religion with polytheistic and pantheistic aspects. Ancestor worship was an important, maybe the central component, of the ancient Vedic religion. Elements of the ancestor worship are still common in modern Hinduism in the form of Śrāddha.

According to Olivelle, some scholars state that the renouncer tradition was an "organic and logical development of ideas found in the Vedic religious culture", while others state that these emerged from the "indigenous non-Aryan population". This scholarly debate is a longstanding one, and is ongoing.

=== Rituals ===
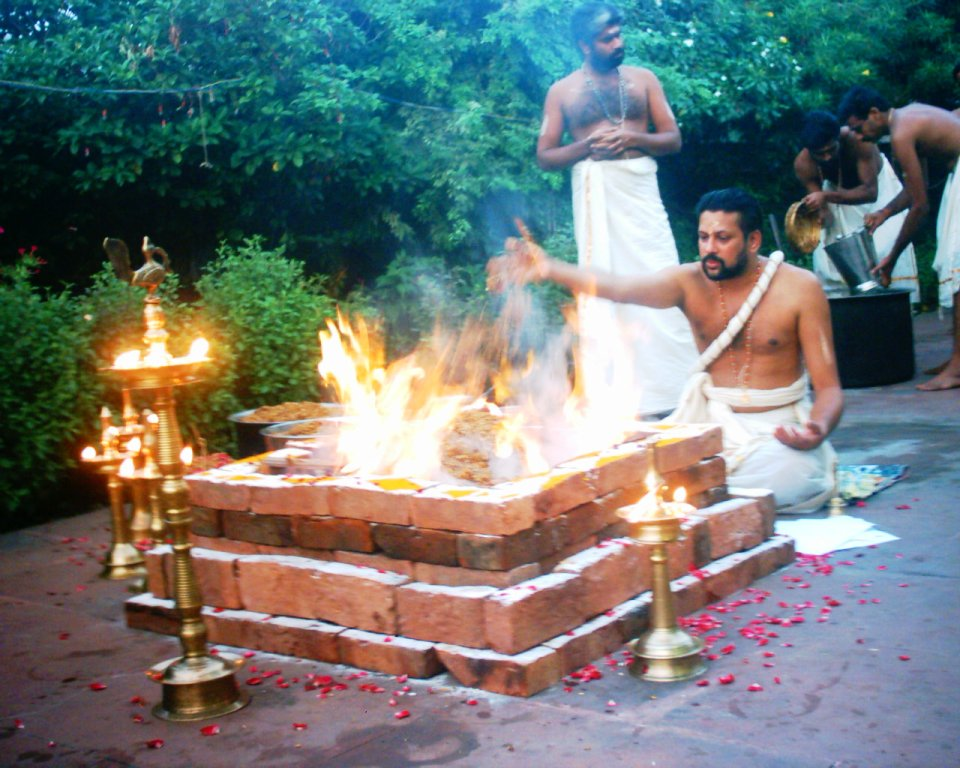
A Śrauta yajna being performed in Kerala

Specific rituals and sacrifices of the Vedic religion include, among others:

- Fire rituals involving oblations (havir):
  - The Agnyadheya, or installation of the fire
  - The Agnihotra or oblation to Agni, a sun charm
  - The Darshapurnamsa, the new and full moon sacrifices
  - The four seasonal (Cāturmāsya) sacrifices
  - The Agnicayana, the sophisticated ritual of piling the fire altar
- The Pashubandhu, the (semi-)annual animal sacrifice
- The Soma rituals, which involved the extraction, utility and consumption of Soma:
  - The Jyotishtoma
    - The Agnishtoma
      - The Pravargya (originally an independent rite, later absorbed into the soma rituals)
    - The Ukthya
    - The Sodashin
    - The Atyagnishtoma
    - The Atiratra
    - The Aptoryama
    - The Vajapeya
- The royal consecration (Rajasuya) sacrifice
- The Ashvamedha (horse sacrifice) or a Yajna dedicated to the glory, wellbeing and prosperity of the kingdom or empire
- The Purushamedha
- The rituals and charms referred to in the Atharvaveda are concerned with medicine and healing practices
- The Gomedha or cow sacrifice:
  - The Taittiriya Brahmana of the Yajur Veda gives instructions for selecting the cow for the sacrifice depending on the deity.
  - Panchasaradiya sava – celebration where 17 cows are immolated once every five years. The Taittiriya Brahmana advocates the Panchasaradiya for those who want to be great.
  - Sulagava – sacrifice where roast beef is offered. It is mentioned in the Grihya Sutra
  - According to Dr. R. Mitra, the offered animal was intended for consumption as detailed in the Asvalayana Sutra. The Gopatha Brahmana lists the different individuals who are to receive the various parts like Pratiharta (neck and hump), the Udgatr, the Neshta, the Sadasya, the householder who performs the sacrifice (the two right feet), his wife (the two left feet) and so on.

The Hindu rites of cremation are seen since the Rigvedic period; while they are attested from early times in the Cemetery H culture, there is a late Rigvedic reference invoking forefathers "both cremated (agnidagdhá-) and uncremated (ánagnidagdha-)". (RV 10.15.14)

=== Pantheon ===
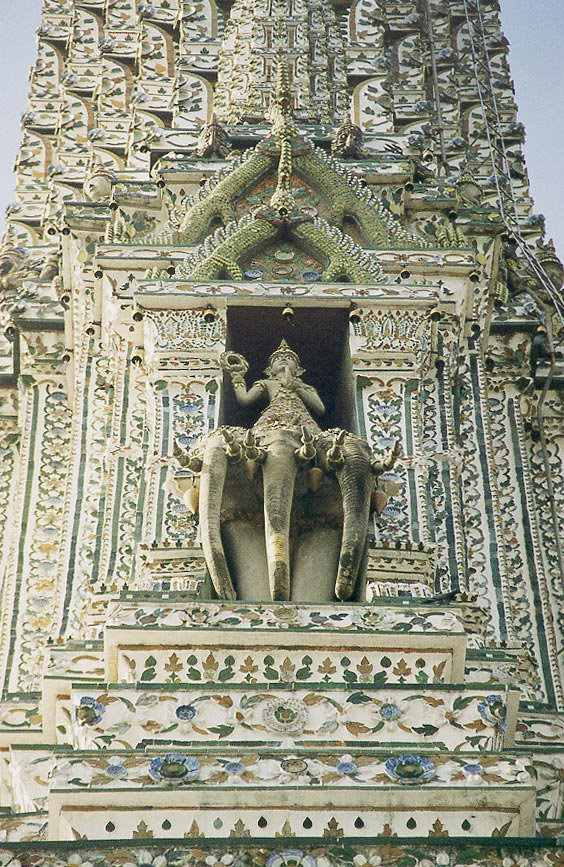
Detail of the Phra Prang, the central tower of the Wat Arun ("Temple of Dawn") in Bangkok, Thailand, showing the ancient Vedic god Indra and three-headed Erawan (Airavata)

Though a large number of names for devas occur in the Rigveda, only 33 devas are counted, eleven each of earth, space, and heaven. The Vedic pantheon knows two classes, Devas and Asuras. The Devas (Mitra, Varuna, Aryaman, Bhaga, Amsa, etc.) are deities of cosmic and social order, from the universe and kingdoms down to the individual. The Rigveda is a collection of hymns to various deities, most notably heroic Indra, Agni the sacrificial fire and messenger of the gods, and Soma, the deified sacred drink of the Indo-Iranians. Also prominent is Varuna (often paired with Mitra) and the group of "All-gods", the Vishvadevas.

=== Sages ===
In the Hindu tradition, the revered sages of this era were Yajnavalkya, Atharvan, Atri, Bharadvaja, Gautama Maharishi, Jamadagni, Kashyapa, Vasistha, Bhrigu, Kutsa, Pulastya, Kratu, Pulaha, Vishwamitra Narayana, Kanva, Rishabha, Vamadeva, and Angiras.

=== Ethics – satya and rta ===
Ethics in the Vedas are based on concepts like satya and ṛta.

In the Vedas and later sutras, the meaning of the word satya (सत्य) evolves into an ethical concept about truthfulness and is considered an important virtue. It means being true and consistent with reality in one's thought, speech and action.

Vedic ṛtá and its Avestan equivalent aša are both thought by some to derive from Proto-Indo-Iranian *Hr̥tás "truth", which in turn may continue from a possible Proto-Indo-European *h₂r-tós "properly joined, right, true", from a presumed root *h₂er-. The derivative noun ṛta is defined as "fixed or settled order, rule, divine law or truth". As Mahony (1998) notes, however, the term can be translated as "that which has moved in a fitting manner" – although this meaning is not actually cited by authoritative Sanskrit dictionaries it is a regular derivation from the verbal root -, and abstractly as "universal law" or "cosmic order", or simply as "truth". The latter meaning dominates in the Avestan cognate to Ṛta, aša.

Owing to the nature of Vedic Sanskrit, the term Ṛta can be used to indicate numerous things, either directly or indirectly, and both Indian and European scholars have experienced difficulty in arriving at fitting interpretations for Ṛta in all of its various usages in the Vedas, though the underlying sense of "ordered action" remains universally evident.

The term is also found in the Proto-Indo-Iranian religion, the religion of the Indo-Iranian peoples. The term dharma was already used in the later Brahmanical thoughts, where it was conceived as an aspect of ṛta.

=== Vedic mythology ===
A central myth of Vedic ritual is found in Rig Veda 1.32, narrating how Indra drinks Soma and slays the dragon (ahi) Vritra, thus freeing the rivers, the cows, and Dawn.

Vedic mythology contains numerous elements which are common to Indo-European mythological traditions, like the mythologies of Persia, Greece, and Rome, and those of the Celtic, Germanic, Baltic, and Slavic peoples. According to West, The Vedic god Indra corresponds to a class of Indo-European storm gods like Thor, Perun, Perkunas and Taranis. According to Boyce, the Vedic deity Yama, the lord of the dead, is connected to Yima of Persian mythology through a common Indo-Iranic tradition, although the two figures develop different roles in their respective traditions. Vedic hymns refer to these and other deities, often 33, consisting of 8 Vasus, 11 Rudras, 12 Adityas, and in the late Rigvedas, Prajapati. These deities belong to the three regions of the universe or heavens, the earth, and the intermediate space.

Some major deities of the Vedic tradition include Indra, Dyaus, Surya, Agni, Ushas, Vayu, Varuna, Mitra, Aditi, Yama, Soma, Sarasvati, Prithvi, and Rudra.

== Post-Vedic religions ==
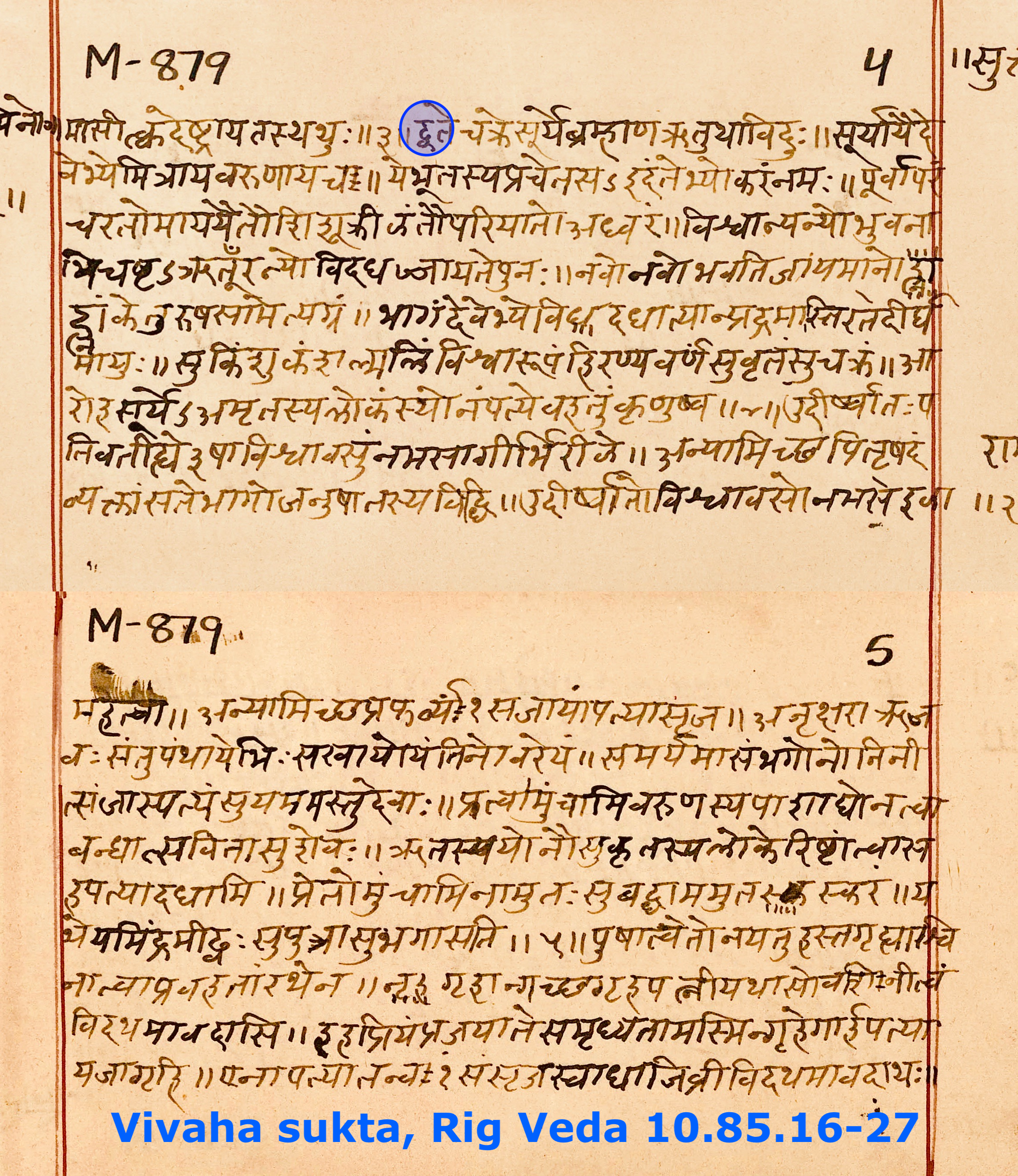
The hymn 10.85 of the Rigveda includes the Vivaha-sukta (above). Its recitation continues to be a part of Hindu wedding rituals.

The Vedic period is held to have ended around 500 BCE. The period between 800–200 BCE is the formative period for later Hinduism, Jainism and Buddhism. According to Michaels, the period between 500–200 BCE is a time of "ascetic reformism", while the period between 200 BCE – 1100 CE is the time of "classical Hinduism", since there was "a turning point between the Vedic religion and Hindu religions". Muesse discerns a longer period of change, namely between 800–200 BCE, which he calls the "classical period", when "traditional religious practices and beliefs were reassessed. The Brahmins and the rituals they performed no longer enjoyed the same prestige they had in the Vedic period".

Brahmanism evolved into Hinduism, which is significantly different from the preceding Brahmanism, though "it is also convenient to have a single term for the whole complex of interrelated traditions." The transition from ancient Brahmanism to schools of Hinduism was a form of evolution in interaction with non-Vedic traditions. This transition preserved many central ideas and theosophy found in the Vedas while synergistically integrating non-Vedic ideas. (Note: Scholars regard Hinduism as a synthesis of various Indian cultures and traditions, with diverse roots and no single founder. Among its roots are the Vedic religion of the late Vedic period and its emphasis on the status of Brahmans, but also the religions of the Indus Valley civilisation, the Sramana or renouncer traditions of east India, and "popular or local traditions". This Hindu synthesis emerged after the Vedic period, between c. 500 – 200 BCE and c. 300 BCE, in the period of the Second Urbanisation and the early Hindu synthesis, and later classical Hinduism (c. 200 BCE – 1200 CE)) While part of Hinduism, Vedanta, Samkhya and Yoga schools of Hinduism share their concern with escape from the suffering of existence with Buddhism.

=== Continuation of orthodox ritual ===
According to Axel Michaels, the Vedic gods declined but did not disappear, and local cults were assimilated into the Vedic-Brahmanic pantheon, which changed into the Hindu pantheon. Deities such as Shiva and Vishnu became more prominent and gave rise to Shaivism and Vaishnavism.

According to David Knipe, some communities in India have preserved and continue to practice portions of the historical Vedic religion, as observed in Kerala and Andhra Pradesh states and elsewhere. According to the historian and Sanskrit linguist Michael Witzel, some of the rituals of the Kalash people have elements of the historical Vedic religion, but there are also some differences such as the presence of fire next to the altar instead of "in the altar" as in the Vedic religion.

=== Mīmāṃsā and Vedanta ===
Mīmāṃsā philosophers argue that there was no need to postulate a maker for the world, just as there was no need for an author to compose the Vedas or a god to validate the rituals. Mīmāṃsā argues that the gods named in the Vedas have no existence apart from the mantras that speak their names. To that regard, the power of the mantras is what is seen as the power of gods.

Of the continuation of the Vedic tradition in the Upanishads, Fowler writes the following:

Despite the radically different nature of the Upanishads in relation to the Vedas it has to be remembered that the material of both form the Veda or "knowledge" which is sruti literature. So the Upanishads develop the ideas of the Vedas beyond their ritual formalism and should not be seen as isolated from them. The fact that the Vedas that are more particularly emphasized in the Vedanta: the efficacy of the Vedic ritual is not rejected, it is just that there is a search for the Reality that informs it.

The Upanishads gradually evolved into Vedanta, which is one of the primary schools of thought within Hinduism. Vedanta considers itself "the purpose or goal [end] of the Vedas".

=== Sramana tradition ===
The non-Vedic śramaṇa traditions existed alongside Brahmanism. (Note: Cromwell: "Alongside Brahmanism was the non-Aryan Shramanic culture with its roots going back to prehistoric times.") These were not direct outgrowths of Vedism, but movements with mutual influences with Brahmanical traditions, reflecting "the cosmology and anthropology of a much older, pre-Aryan upper class of northeastern India". Jainism and Buddhism evolved out of the Shramana tradition.

There are Jaina references to 22 prehistoric tirthankaras. In this view, Jainism peaked at the time of Mahavira (traditionally put in the 6th century BCE). Buddhism, traditionally put from c. 500 BCE, declined in India over the 5th to 12th centuries in favor of Puranic Hinduism and Islam.

== See also ==
- Pushyamitra Shunga
- Ancient Iranian religion
- Hinduism in Iran
- Iranian mythology
- Rishikesh Complex of Ruru Kshetra – Vedic ritual site in Nepal
- Vedic priesthood
- A Vedic Word Concordance
- Zoroastrianism

== Sources ==
=== Printed sources ===
- Allen, Michael S. (2022). The Ocean of Inquiry: Niscaldas and the Premodern Origins of Modern Hinduism. Oxford University Press. ISBN 9780197638989.
- Anthony, David W. (2007). The Horse, the Wheel, and Language. How Bronze-Age riders from the Eurasian steppes shaped the modern world. Princeton University Press.
- Basham, Arthur Llewellyn (1989). The Origins and Development of Classical Hinduism. Oxford University Press. ISBN 9780195073492.
- Beckwith, Christopher I. (2011). Empires of the Silk Road. A history of central Eurasia from the Bronze Age to the present. Princeton University Press.
- Bronkhorst, Johannes (2007). Greater Magadha: Studies in the Culture of Early India. BRILL. ISBN 9789004157194.
- Bronkhorst, Johannes (2015). "The historiography of Brahmanism". In Otto; Rau; Rupke (eds.). History and Religion:Narrating a Religious Past. Walter deGruyter.
- Bronkhorst, Johannes (2016). How the Brahmains Won. BRILL.
- Bronkhorst, Johannes (2017). "Brahmanism: Its place in ancient Indian society". Contributions to Indian Sociology. 51 (3): 361–369. doi:10.1177/0069966717717587. S2CID 220050987.
- Bryant, Edwin (2001). The Quest for the Origins of Vedic Culture: The Indo-Aryan migration debate. Oxford University Press.
- Bryant, Edwin F.; Patton, Laurie L., eds. (2005). The Indo-Aryan Controversy: Evidence and inference in Indian history. London: Routledge. ISBN 0-7007-1463-4.
- Duchesne-Guillemin, Jacques (Summer 1963). "Heraclitus and Iran". History of Religions. 3 (1): 34–49. doi:10.1086/462470. S2CID 62860085.
- Flood, Gavin D. (1996). An Introduction to Hinduism. Cambridge University Press.
- Flood, Gavin (2008). The Blackwell Companion to Hinduism. John Wiley & Sons. ISBN 9780470998687.
- Flood, Gavin (2020). Hindu Monotheism. Cambridge University Press.
- Gomez, Luis O. (2013), "Buddhism in India", in Kitagawa, Joseph (ed.), The Religious Traditions of Asia: Religion, History, and Culture, Routledge, ISBN 9781136875908
- Halbfass, Wilhelm (1991). Tradition and Reflection. SUNY Press. ISBN 9780791403617.
- Heesterman, Jan (2005). "Vedism and Brahmanism". In Jones, Lindsay (ed.). The Encyclopedia of Religion. Vol. 14 (2nd ed.). Macmillan Reference. pp. 9552–9553. ISBN 0-02-865733-0.
- Hiltebeitel, Alf (2002). "Hinduism". In Kitagawa, Joseph (ed.). The Religious Traditions of Asia: Religion, history, and culture. Routledge. ISBN 9781136875977.
- Hiltebeitel, Alf (2007). "Hinduism". In Kitagawa, Joseph (ed.). The Religious Traditions of Asia: Religion, History, and Culture (Digital printing ed.). Routledge. ISBN 9781136875908.
- Jamison, Stephanie; Witzel, Michael (1992). "Vedic Hinduism" (PDF). Harvard University. Archived from the original (PDF) on 5 October 2003.
- Knipe, David M. (2015). Vedic Voices: Intimate narratives of a living Andhra tradition. Oxford, UK: Oxford University Press.
- Kuz'mina, Elena Efimovna (2007), J. P. Mallory (ed.), The Origin of the Indo-Iranians, Brill, ISBN 978-9004160545
- Larson, Gerald James (2009). "Hinduism". World Religions in America: An Introduction. Westminster: John Knox Press. pp. 179–198. ISBN 978-1-61164-047-2.
- Laumakis, Stephen J. (21 February 2008). An Introduction to Buddhist Philosophy. Cambridge University Press. ISBN 9781139469661.
- Mallory; Adams (2006). The Oxford Introduction to Proto-Indo-European and the Proto-Indo-European World. Oxford University Press.
- Mannathukkaren, Nissim (2024). Hindu Nationalism in South India: The Rise of Saffron in Kerala. Taylor & Francis.
- Melton, Gordon J.; Baumann, Martin (2010). Religions of the World: A comprehensive encyclopedia of beliefs and practices. ABC-CLIO.
- Michaels, Axel (2004). Hinduism. Past and present. Princeton, New Jersey: Princeton University Press.
- Muesse, Mark William (2003). Hinduism. Great World Religions.
- Osborne, E (2005), Accessing R.E. Founders & Leaders, Buddhism, Hinduism and Sikhism Teacher's Book Mainstream, Folens Limited
- Samuel, Geoffrey (2010). The Origins of Yoga and Tantra. Indic religions to the thirteenth century. Cambridge University Press.
- Singh, Upinder (2008). A History of Ancient and Early Medieval India: From the Stone Age to the 12th century. Pearson Education India. ISBN 978-81-317-1120-0.
- von Stietencron, Heinrich (2005). Hindu Myth, Hindu History: Religion, art, and politics. Orient Blackswan.
- Sullivan, Bruce M. (2001). The A to Z of Hinduism. Rowman & Littlefield. ISBN 978-0-8108-4070-6.
- Welbon, Guy (2004). "Hindu Beginnings. Assessing the Period 1000 BCE to 300 CE" (PDF). Education About Asia. 9 (2).
- White, David Gordon (2003). Kiss of the Yogini. Chicago: University of Chicago Press. ISBN 0-226-89483-5.
  - White, David Gordon (2006). Kiss of the Yogini: "Tantric Sex" in its South Asian Contexts. University of Chicago Press. ISBN 9780226027838.
- Witzel, Michael (1995). "Early Sanskritization: Origin and Development of the Kuru state" (PDF). EJVS. 1 (4). Archived from the original (PDF) on 11 June 2007.
- Zimmer, Heinrich (1989). Phiosophies of India. Princeton University Press.
