= Fire worship =

Worship or deification of fire

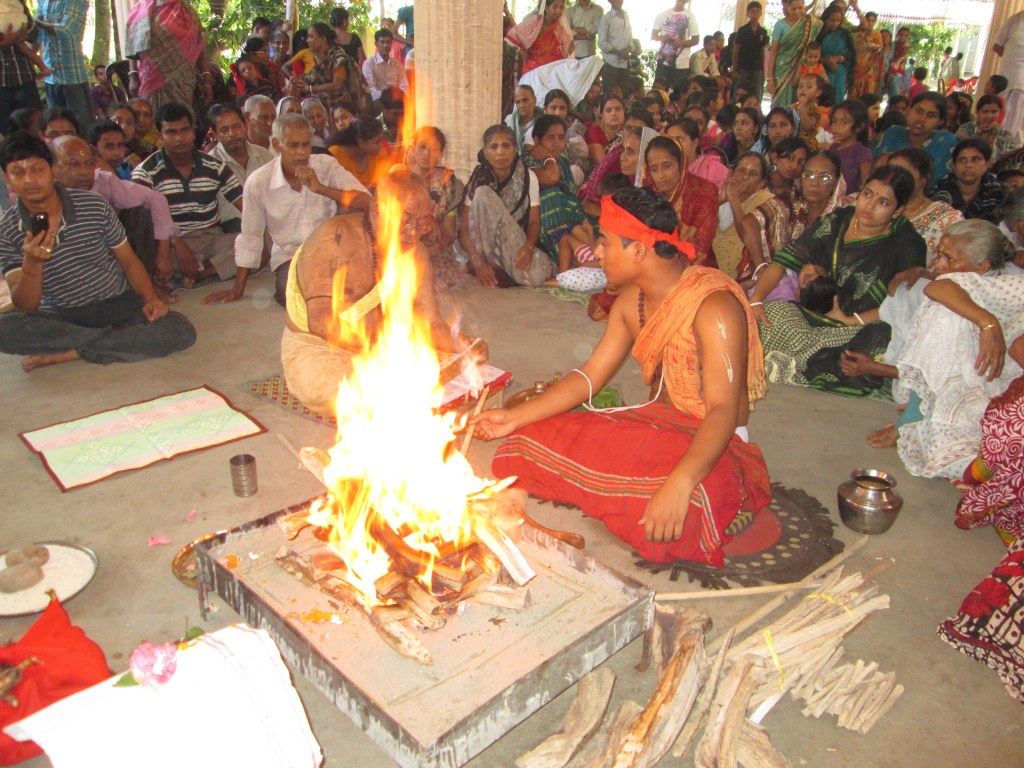
Hindu yajna fire ritual, 2013

Worship or deification of fire (also as pyrolatry or pyrolatria, and occasionally as pyrodulia as a nuanced academic comparison to pyrolatria when considering latria and dulia as respectively direct and symbolic types of veneration of divinity, so as pyrodulia when the fire is deemed to symbolically represent a divinity rather than be the object of direct worship), or fire rituals, religious rituals centred on a fire, are known from various religions. Fire has been an important part of human culture since the Lower Paleolithic. Religious or animist notions connected to fire are assumed to reach back to such early prehuman times.

== Indo-European religions ==
In Indo-European languages, there were two concepts regarding fire: that of an animate type called *h₁n̥gʷnis (cf. Sanskrit agni, Croatian oganj, Albanian: enji, English ignite from Latin ignis, Polish ogień and Russian ogon), and an inanimate type *péh₂wr̥ (cf. English fire, Greek pyr, Sanskrit pu). A similar distinction existed for water.

Fire rituals that are commonly found among Indo-European peoples have been firstly attested by the Vedas, with hymns dedicated to the fire god Agni.

=== Albanian ===
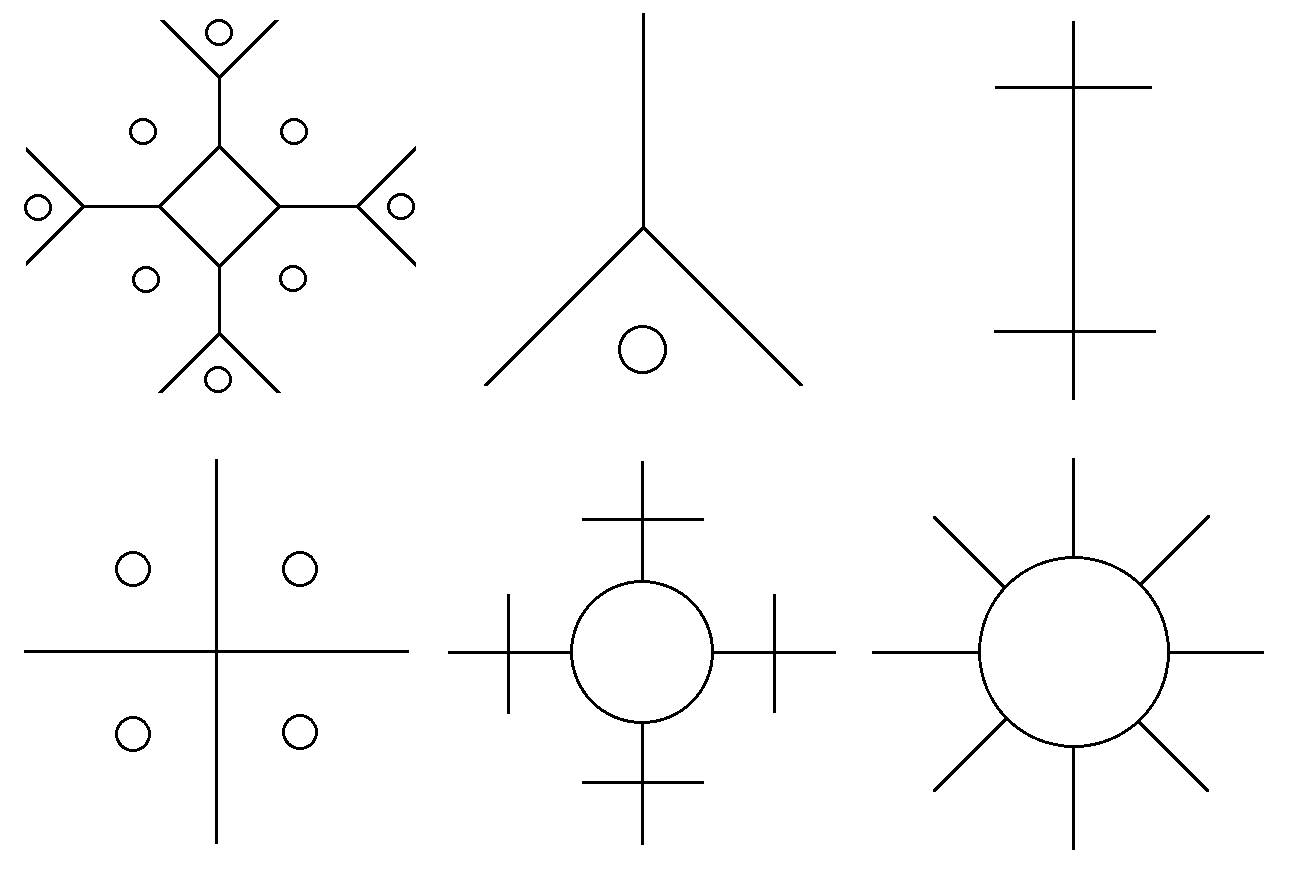
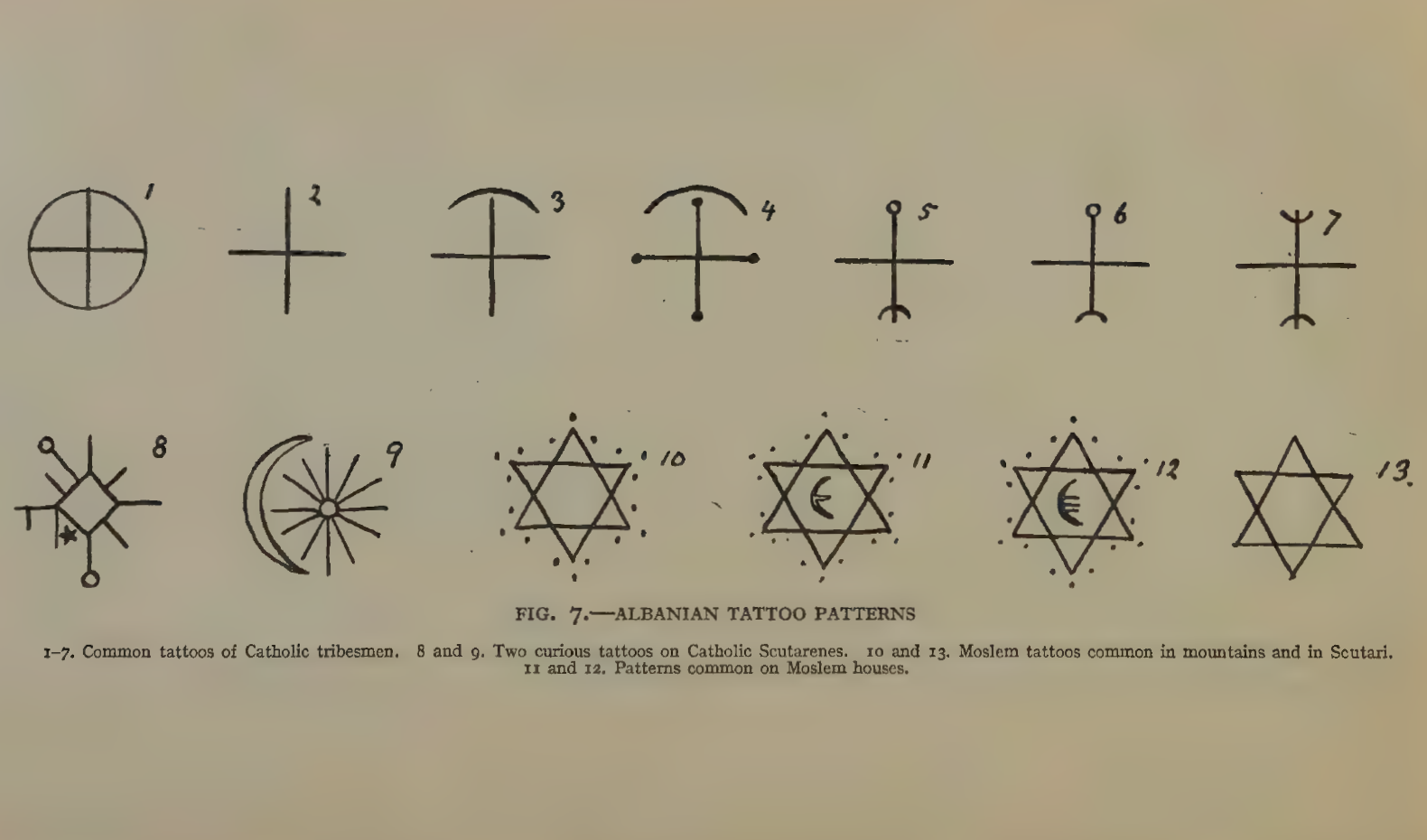
Albanian traditional tattoo patterns: 19th century (top), early 20th century (bottom). They are symbols of the Sun (Dielli) and the Moon (Hëna); the cross (also swastika in some tattoos) is the Albanian traditional way to represent the deified Fire – Zjarri, evidently also called with the theonym Enji.

In Albanian tradition the fire cult and ritual practices have played a prominent role. Enji (Albanian: [ɛɲi]) is the name of the fire god, evidently contained in the week day name that was dedicated to him – e enjte – the Albanian word for Thursday. The Fire – Zjarri – is deified in Albanian tradition as releaser of light and heat with the power to ward off darkness and evil, affect cosmic phenomena and give strength to the Sun (Dielli, who is worshiped as the god of light, sky and weather, giver of life, health and energy, and all-seeing eye), sustain the continuity between life and afterlife and between the generations. The divine power of Fire is used for the hearth and the rituals, including calendar fires, sacrificial offerings, divination, purification, and protection from big storms and other potentially harmful events. Fire worship and rituals are associated with the cult of the Sun (Dielli), the cult of the hearth (vatër) and the ancestor, and the cult of fertility in agriculture and animal husbandry. The practices associated with ritual fires among Albanians have been historically fought by the Christian clergy, without success. The fire god Enji was presumably worshiped by the Illyrians in antiquity and he may have been the most prominent god of the Albanian pantheon in Roman times by interpreting Jupiter, when week-day names were formed in the Albanian language. The belief in a prominent fire and wind god, who was referred to as I Verbti ("the blind one"), and who was often regarded more powerful than the Christian God, survived in northern Albania until recent times. Under Christianisation the god of fire was demonised and considered a false god, and it was spread about that anyone who invoked him would be blinded by fire. The purifying power of fire underlies the Albanian folk belief according to which the fire god is the enemy of uncleanliness and the opponent of filth.

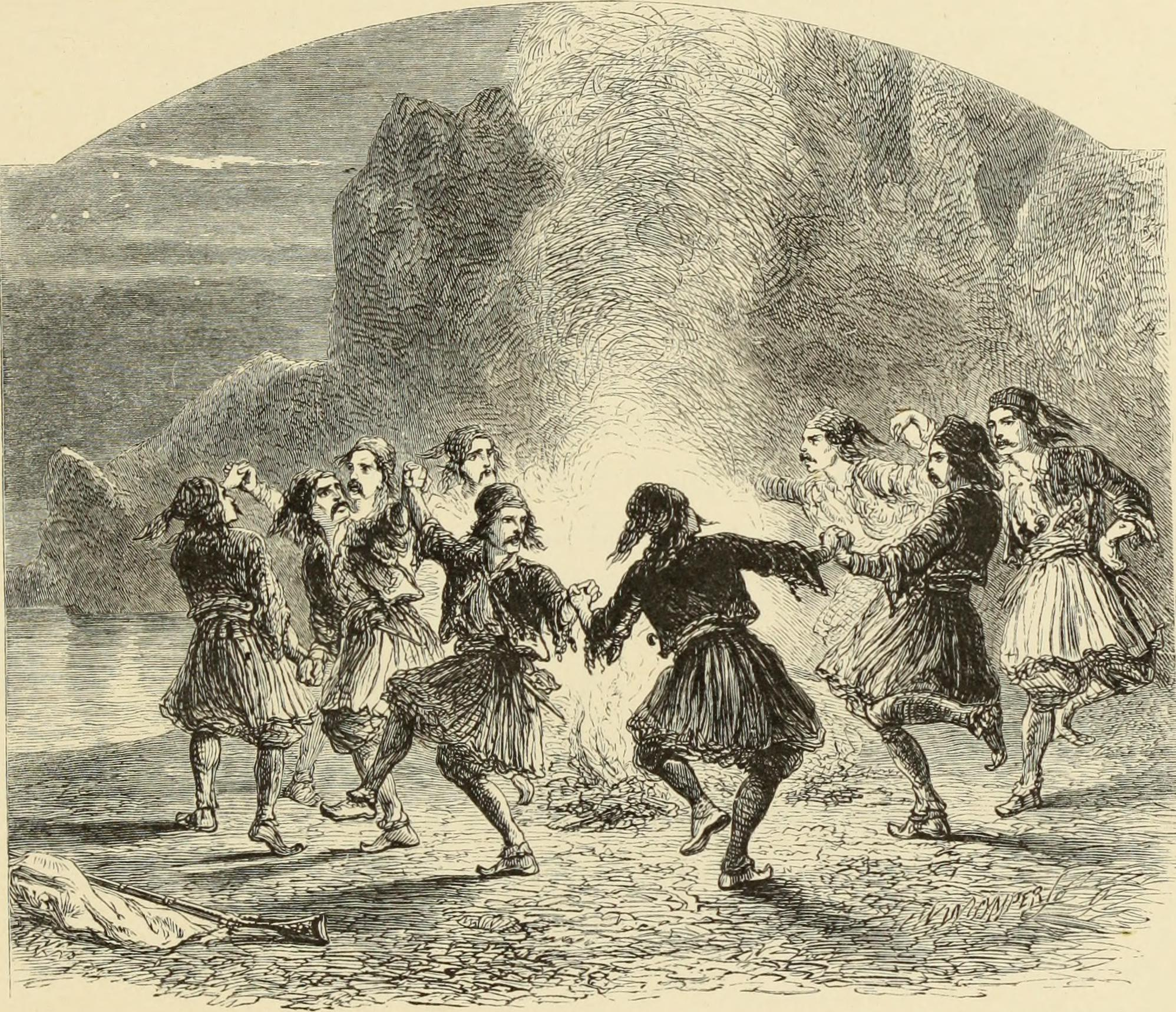
Albanian warrior dance in circle around fire (zjarri), drawing from the book Childe Harold's Pilgrimage written by Lord Byron in the early 19th century. Practiced for several hours with very short intervals, the dance gets new vigour from the words of the accompanying song that starts with a battle cry invoking war drums, and which is of a piece with the movement and usually changed only once or twice during the whole performance. The ritual purifying fire is traditionally used by Albanians, in particular singing and dancing around it, to gain protection and energising from its supernatural power.

In Albanian tradition, Fire is deeply respected. To spit into it is taboo. Albanian solemn oaths are taken "by fire", and the worst curse formulas are cast for the extinguishing of the individual's, family's and clan's fire. The lineage is identified with an original fire, and the members of a same tribe/clan are "from the same fire". Zjarri i Vatrës ("the Fire of the Hearth") is regarded as the offspring of the Sun and the sustainer of the continuity between the world of the living and that of the dead and between the generations, ensuring the survival of the lineage (fis or farë). The absence of fire in a house is traditionally considered a great curse. Protectors of the hearth are Gjarpri i Vatrës ("the Serpent of the Hearth"), a household benign serpent, and Nëna e Vatrës ("the Mother of the Hearth"). Zjarret e Vitit ("Ritual Calendar Fires") are associated with the cosmic cycle and the rhythms of agricultural and pastoral life. The ritual collective fires (based on the house, kinship, or neighborhood) or bonfires in yards (especially on high places) lit before sunrise to celebrate the main traditional Albanian festivities such as Dita e Verës (spring equinox), Shëngjergji, the winter festivals (winter solstice), or mountain pilgrimages, often accompanied by animal sacrifices, are related to the cult of the Sun, and in particular they are practiced with the function to give strength to the Sun and to ward off evil according to the old beliefs. Zjarri i Gjallë, Zjarri i Egër, or Zjarri i Keq – traditionally kindled with rudimentary fire making tools and techniques – is the ritual purifying Fire used for the cleansing, protection, healing, and energising of livestock and humans. Albanian folk beliefs regard the lightning as Zjarri i Qiellit ("the Fire of the Sky") and consider it as the "weapon of the deity". During big storms with torrential rains, lightning and hail, which often cause great damage to agriculture, livestock, and to the rural economy in general, Albanians traditionally bring outdoors Fire as a continuous chain or in a container, as well as ember and fire-related metallic objects, seeking assistance from the supernatural power of the Fire, in order to turn the storm away and to avert the harms it can cause to the community.

=== Armenia ===
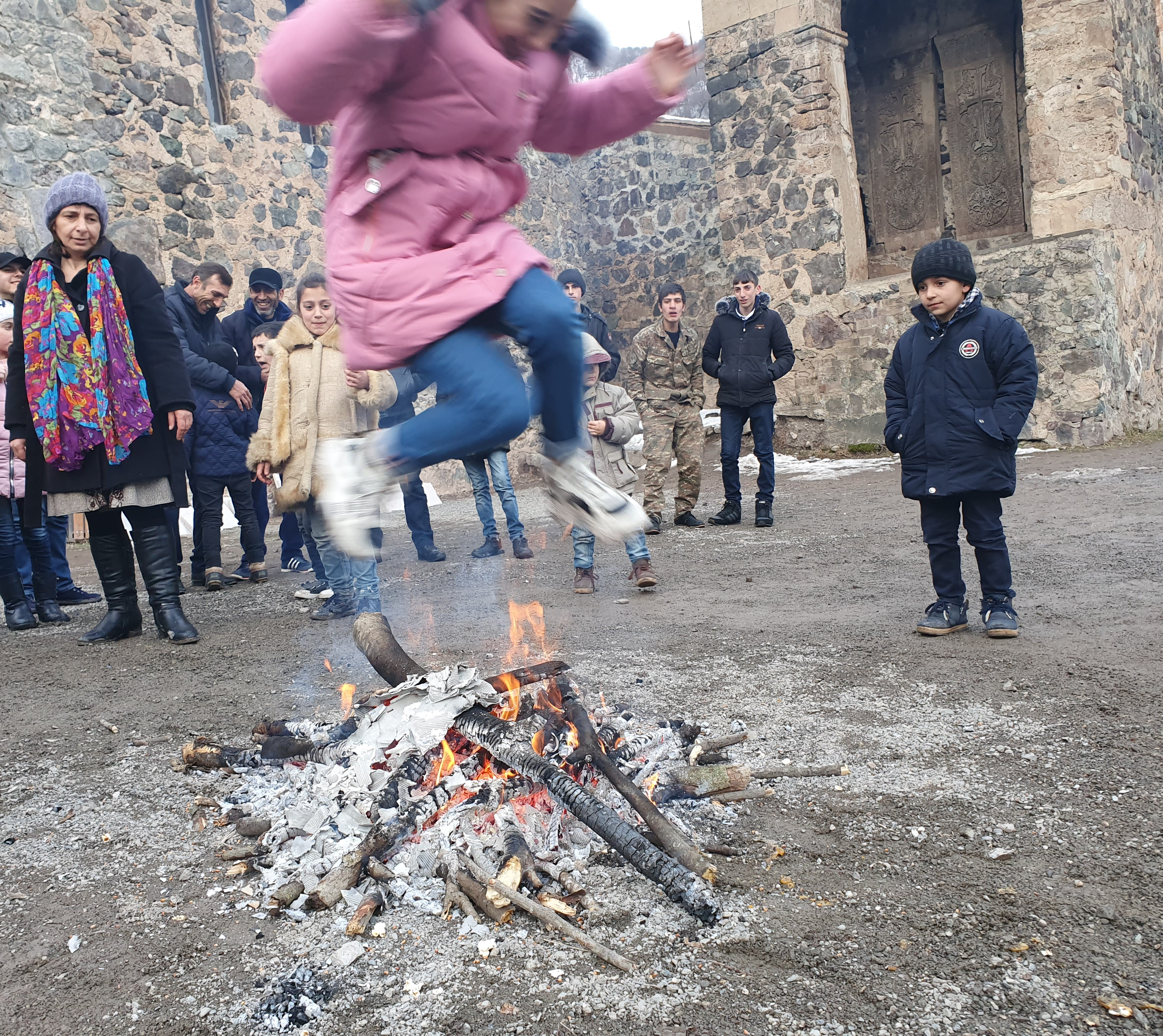
Young Armenians celebrate by jumping over the fire.

Armenia carries an ancient tradition of fire worship called Trndez (Armenian: տրնդեզ), a feast of purification in the Armenian Apostolic Church and Armenian Catholic Churches, celebrated 40 days after Jesus' birth. The celebration of Trndez is pagan in origin, and is originally connected with sun/fire worship in ancient pre-Christian Armenia, symbolizing the coming of spring and fertility. It was originally referred to as Derendez, meaning “a bundle of straw in front of your house.” In ancient Armenia, the event was associated with the worship of Vahagn, the Armenian god of fire, sun, war, and courage. People believed that the strength of the fire would eradicate the winter’s cold and allow for fertile land and a prosperous harvest. Couples, especially newlyweds, would jump over the Trndez flames for luck, prosperity, and fertility. The fire’s ashes were believed to have healing properties as people would use it as an ointment for pain and rub it into their eyelids to improve their eyesight.

Armenia also fell within the Zoroastrian sphere of influence under various Persian imperial regimes.

=== Baltic ===
The Holy Fire is referred to as Ugnis szwenta in Lithuanian, and the 'Mother of Fire' is referred to as Uguns māte in Latvian.

Fire is very often mentioned by chroniclers, when they were describing Lithuanian rituals. The Lithuanian king Algirdas was even addressed as a "fire worshiper King of Lithuania" (τῷ πυρσολάτρῃ ῥηγὶ τῶν Λιτβῶν) in the documents of a patriarch Nilus of Constantinople.

=== Celtic ===
Celtic mythology had Belenus, whose name, "shining one", associated him with fire.

=== Graeco-Roman ===
Fire worship in Graeco-Roman tradition had two separate forms: fire of the hearth and fire of the forge. Hearth worship was maintained in Rome by the Vestal Virgins, who served the goddess Vesta, protector of the home, who had a sacred flame as the symbol of her presence in the city (cf. Sacred fire of Vesta). The Greek equivalent of the goddess was Hestia, whose worship took place more commonly within the household. The fire of the forge was associated with the Greek god Hephaestus and the Roman equivalent Vulcan. These two seem to have served both as craft-guild patrons and as protectors against accidental fires in cities. Also associated with fire is the titanic god Prometheus, who stole fire for humans from the gods. Most forms of worship in Graeco-Roman religion involved either cooking or burning completely an animal on a fire made on an altar in front of a temple (see hecatomb).

=== Indo-Iranian ===
Archaeologically, evidence for Indo-Iranian fire worship and the rite of cremation is found at the transition from the Sintashta-Petrovka to the Andronovo culture around 1500 BC. Fire worship was prevalent in Vedic, with Agni the fire god, and the ancient Iranian religion. Whereas cremation became ubiquitous in Hinduism, it was prohibited in Zoroastrianism. Evidence of fire worship has also been found at the Indus Valley sites of Kalibangan and Lothal.

==== Hinduism ====
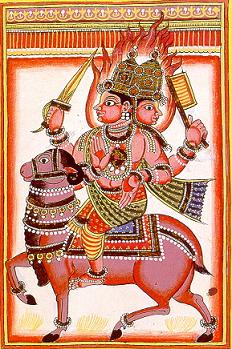
Agni the Hindu deity of fire, with a very prominent place among Rigvedic deities

In the Vedic tradition of Hinduism, fire is a central element in a yajna ceremony, with Agni, "fire", playing the role as mediator between the worshipper and the other gods. Related concepts are the Agnihotra ritual, the invocation of the healing properties of fire; the Agnicayana ritual, which is the building of a fire altar to Agni; and Agnistoma, which is one of the seven Somayajnas. In the Vaishnava tradition of Hinduism, Agni is considered the tongue of Vishnu, hence rendering all sacrifices offered to any given deity ultimately a sacrifice to Vishnu.

In modern Hinduism, Yajna is the general terms for the many types of rituals conducted before a fire, with homa the term for relatively small fire pujas conducted in a domestic setting, or as part of a wedding ceremony (a vivaha homa). The fire is very carefully constructed and tended by a specialist Brahmin pujari, with much reciting of appropriate passages from sacred texts.

==== Zoroastrianism ====
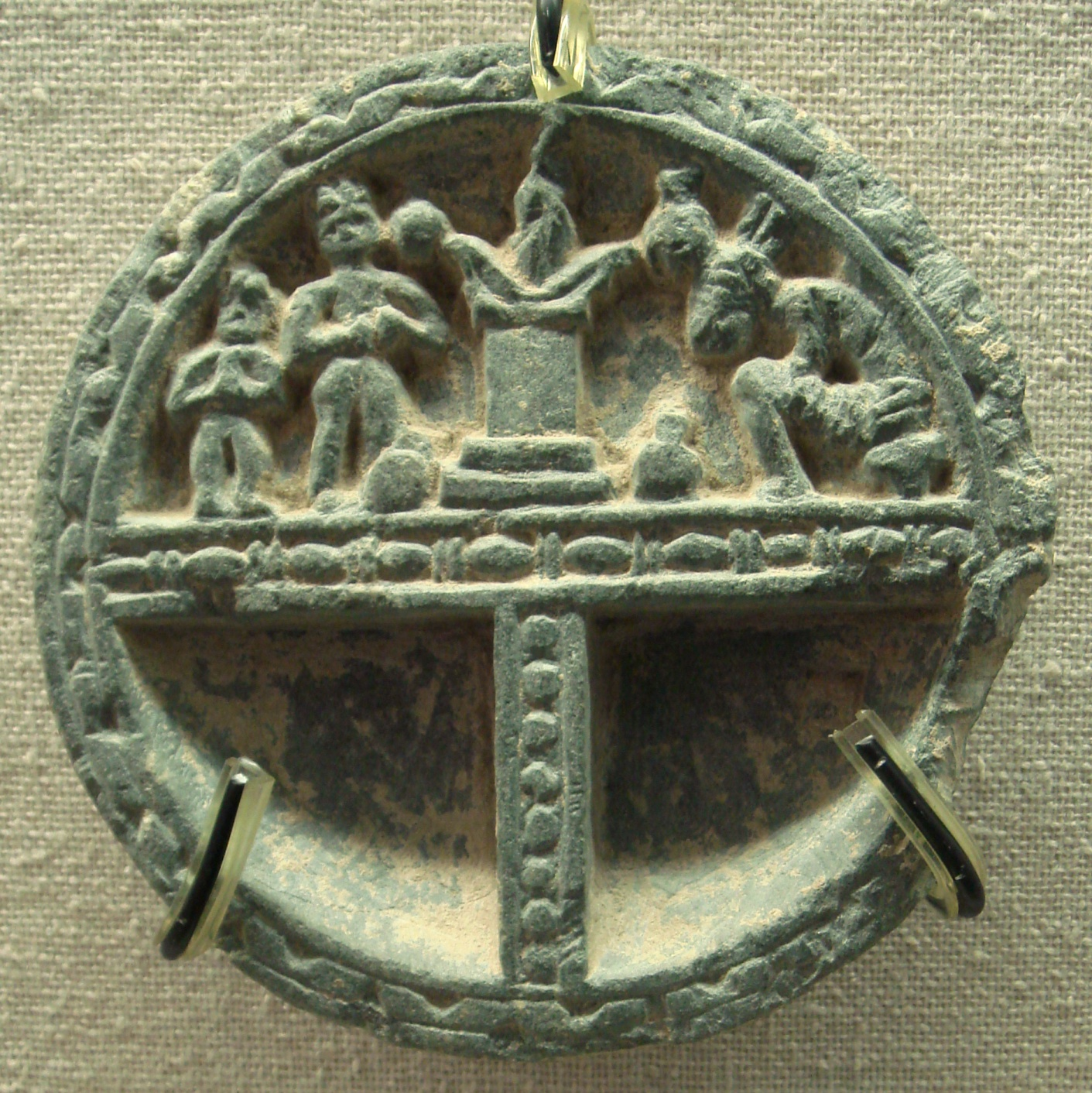
Indo-Parthian stone palette, illustrating a fire ritual

In Zoroastrianism, fire is considered to be an agent of purity and as a symbol of righteousness and truth. In the present day this is explained to be because fire burns ever-upward and cannot itself be polluted. Sadeh and Chaharshanbe Suri are both fire-related festivals celebrated throughout Greater Iran and date back to when Zoroastrianism was still the predominant religion of the region. Zoroastrianism, however, is sometimes mischaracterised as a fire-worshipping religion, whereas it is a monotheistic faith with Ahura Mazda as its central figure and a dualistic cosmology of good and evil. Fire simply exemplifies a medium for spiritual wisdom and purity, but is not worshipped.

=== Slavic ===
In Slavic paganism, Svarog, meaning "bright and clear", was the spirit of fire. The best known and dramatic among numerous Slavic pagan fire rituals is the jumping over the bonfire on the Kupala Night.

== Abrahamic religions ==
=== Judaism ===
In the narratives of the Hebrew Bible, Yahweh is associated with fire more than any other element or image, and the Presence of Yahweh is conceptualised as a devouring fire, especially but not exclusively in the Book of Exodus, appearing as fire on top of Mount Sinai, inside the Ark of the Covenant, as the burning bush and the pillar of fire that guides the Israelites, and in extensive poetic imagery. Offerings to Yahweh in Jewish ritual recorded in the Hebrew Bible and the Talmud are done by fire.

=== Christianity ===
The Holy Fire in the Church of the Holy Sepulchre in Jerusalem has been consecutively documented since 1106 AD.

Fire is often used as symbol or sign of God's presence in Christianity and, since it is held to be a creation along with water and other elements. In the New Testament, Jesus is depicted as the person who will bring fire to the earth. The Holy Spirit is sometimes called the "tongues of flame".

== Other religions ==
Fire continues to be a part of many human religions and cultures. For example, it is used in cremation and bonfires; candles are used in various religious ceremonies; eternal flames are used to remind of notable occasions; and the Olympic Flame burns for the duration of the games.

In Japanese mythology, Kagu-tsuchi is the god of destructive fire.

== See also ==
- Ateshgah of Baku
- Bonfire of the vanities
- Eternal flame
- Holocaust (sacrifice)
- List of fire gods
- Manipura (fire chakra)
- Nature worship
- Nymphaion (fire sanctuary)
- Solar deity
- Zoroastrianism

== Bibliography ==
- Brahaj, Jaho (2007). Flamuri i Kombit Shqiptar: origjina, lashtësia. Enti Botues "Gjergj Fishta". ISBN 9789994338849.
- De Rapper, Gilles (2012). "Blood and Seed, Trunk and Hearth: Kinship and Common Origin in southern Albania". In Hemming, Andreas; Kera, Gentiana; Pandelejmoni, Enriketa (eds.). Albania: Family, Society and Culture in the 20th century. LIT Verlag Münster. pp. 79–95. ISBN 9783643501448.
- Doja, Albert (2005). "Mythology and Destiny" (PDF). Anthropos. 100 (2): 449–462. doi:10.5771/0257-9774-2005-2-449. JSTOR 40466549. S2CID 115147696.
- Doli, Flamur (2009). "Decoration from the house snake cult belief system, as evidenced in Kosovan vernacular architecture". Thesis Kosova (1): 127–144.
- Durham, Edith (1928). Some tribal origins, laws and customs of the Balkans. George Allen & Unwin. ISBN 978-0-598-76888-9.
- Elsie, Robert (2001). A dictionary of Albanian religion, mythology and folk culture. NYU Press. p. 259. ISBN 978-1-85065-570-1.
- Galaty, Michael; Lafe, Ols; Lee, Wayne; Tafilica, Zamir (2013). Light and Shadow: Isolation and Interaction in the Shala Valley of Northern Albania. The Cotsen Institute of Archaeology Press. ISBN 978-1931745710.
- Gjoni, Irena (2012). Marrëdhënie të miteve dhe kulteve të bregdetit të Jonit me areale të tjera mitike (PhD) (in Albanian). Tirana: University of Tirana, Faculty of History and Philology.
- Hysi, Shyqyri (2006). "Kulte tradicionale shqiptare" [Albanian Traditional Cults]. Gjurmime Albanologjike - Folklor Dhe Etnologji (in Albanian) (36). Instituti Albanologjik i Prishtinës: 349–361.
- Koch, Harold (2015). "Patterns in the diffusion of nomenclature systems: Australian subsections in comparison to European days of the week". In Dag T.T. Haug (ed.). Historical Linguistics 2013: Selected papers from the 21st International Conference on Historical Linguistics, Oslo, 5-9 August 2013. Current Issues in Linguistic Theory. Vol. 334. With the assistance of: Eiríkur Kristjánsson. John Benjamins Publishing Company. ISBN 978-90-272-6818-1.
- Lambertz, Maximilian (1922). Albanische Märchen (und andere Texte zur albanischen Volkskunde). Wien: A. Hölder.
- Lambertz, Maximilian (1973). "Die Mythologie der Albaner". In Hans Wilhelm Haussig (ed.). Wörterbuch der Mythologie (in German). Vol. 2. pp. 455–509.
- Lurker, Manfred (2005). The Routledge Dictionary of Gods and Goddesses, Devils and Demons. Routledge, Taylor & Francis. ISBN 0-203-64351-8.
- Lurker, Manfred (2004). The Routledge dictionary of gods and goddesses, devils and demons. Routledge. ISBN 978-0-415-34018-2.
- Muka, Ali (1984). "Vendi i zjarrit në banesën fshatare të shqipërisë së mesme" [Fireplace in the Peasant Dwelling of Central Albania]. Kultura Popullore (4). Qendra e Studimeve Albanologjike: 29–54.
- Murray-Aynsley, J. C. (1891). "Swastika". Ars Quatuor Coronatorum. IV.
- Norkus, Zenonas (28 July 2017). An Unproclaimed Empire: The Grand Duchy of Lithuania: From the Viewpoint of Comparative Historical Sociology of Empires (1 ed.). Routledge. ISBN 978-1138281547.
- Novik, Alexander (2015). "Lexicon of Albanian Mythology: Areal Studies in the Polylingual Region of Azov Sea". Slavia Meridionalis. 15: 261–273. doi:10.11649/sm.2015.022.
- Orel, Vladimir (1998). Albanian etymological dictionary. Brill. ISBN 978-90-04-11024-3.
- Pipa, Arshi (1993). "Mythology of Albania". In Bonnefoy, Yves (ed.). American, African, and Old European mythologies. University of Chicago Press. ISBN 0-226-06457-3.
- Poghirc, Cicerone (1987). "Albanian Religion". In Mircea Eliade (ed.). The Encyclopedia of Religion. Vol. 1. New York: MacMillan Publishing Co. pp. 178–180.
- Qafleshi, Muharrem (2011). Opoja dhe Gora ndër shekuj [Opoja and Gora During Centuries]. Albanological Institute of Pristina. ISBN 978-9951-596-51-0.
- Sarao, K. T. S. (2021). Baku's Temple of Eternal Fire: Its Connections to Baba Nanak and the Udasi Sadhus. Bloomsbury. ISBN 9789354350986.
- Stadtmüller, Georg (1954). "Altheidnischer Volksglaube und Christianisierung in Albanien". Orientalia Christiana Periodica (in German). XX. Pontificium Institutum Orientalium Studiorum: 211–246.
- Steiner-Karafili, Enit (2010). "Byron and the Albanians: Unearthing Identities". Studia Albanica (2): 137–147. ISSN 0585-5047.
- Stipčević, Aleksandar (2009). "Elementët parahistorike në besimet e arbëreshëve të Zarës". AKTET (in Albanian): 505–509. ISSN 2073-2244.
- Tagliavini, Carlo (1963). Storia di parole pagane e cristiane attraverso i tempi. Brescia: Morcelliana.
- Tirta, Mark (2004). Petrit Bezhani (ed.). Mitologjia ndër shqiptarë (in Albanian). Tirana: Mësonjëtorja. ISBN 99927-938-9-9.
- Treimer, Karl (1971). "Zur Rückerschliessung der illyrischen Götterwelt und ihre Bedeutung für die südslawische Philologie". In Henrik Barić (ed.). Arhiv za Arbanasku starinu, jezik i etnologiju. Vol. I. R. Trofenik. pp. 27–33.
- Useini, Rini (2024). "Ethnology as a Vital Manifestation, (Folk Rites and Practices)". Philosophica. 11 (22–23). University of Tetova: 160–166. doi:10.62792/ut.philosophica.v11.i22-23.p2732. ISSN 2671-3020.
- West, Martin Litchfield (2007). Indo-European Poetry and Myth. Oxford, UK: Oxford University Press. ISBN 978-0-19-928075-9.
