= Hecatombe =

Hecatombe may refer to

- The Greek hecatomb sacrifice
- The stage name of Mexican professional wrestler Máscara Sagrada
- A disaster of planetary scale: an extinction event.
