= Vedic priesthood =

Priests of the Vedic religion

Priests of the Vedic religion are officiants of the yajna service. Yajna is an important part of Hinduism, especially the Vedas. Persons trained for the ritual and proficient in its practice were called r̥tvij (ऋत्विज् 'regularly-sacrificing'). As members of a social class, they were generically known as vipra 'sage' or kavi 'seer'. Specialization of roles attended the elaboration and development of the ritual corpus over time. Eventually a full complement of sixteen ṛtvijas became the custom for major ceremonies. The sixteen consisted of four chief priests and their assistants.

== Chief priests ==
The older references uniformly indicate hotṛ as the presiding priest, with perhaps only the adhvaryu as his assistant in the earliest times. The phrase "seven hotars" is found more than once in the Rigveda. Rigveda 2.1.2 states it as follows,

Devanagari

तवा॑ग्ने हो॒त्रं तव॑ पो॒त्रमृ॒त्वियं॒ तव॑ ने॒ष्ट्रं त्वम॒ग्निदृ॑ताय॒तः ।
तव॑ प्रशा॒स्त्रं त्वम॑ध्वरीयसि ब्र॒ह्मा चासि॑ गृ॒हप॑तिश्च नो॒ दमे॑ ॥

IAST

tavā̍gne ho̱traṃ tava̍ po̱tramṛ̱tviya̱ṃ tava̍ ne̱ṣṭraṃ tvama̱gnidṛ̍tāya̱taḥ.
tava̍ praśā̱straṃ tvama̍dhvarīyasi bra̱hmā cāsi̍ gṛ̱hapa̍tiśca no̱ dame̍ .

English

Thine is the Herald's task and Cleanser's duly timed; Leader art thou, and Kindler for the pious man.
Thou art Director, thou the ministering Priest: thou art the Brahman, Lord and Master in our home.

The above verse enumerates the priests as the hōtr̥, pōtr̥, nēṣṭr̥, agnīdʰ, praśāstr̥ and adʰvaryu.

Rigveda 10.71.11 describes the specialized tasks of the four types of 'companions' in a sacrifice:

Devanagari

ऋ॒चां त्व॒: पोष॑मास्ते पुपु॒ष्वान्गा॑य॒त्रं त्वो॑ गायति॒ शक्व॑रीषु ।
ब्र॒ह्मा त्वो॒ वद॑ति जातवि॒द्यां य॒ज्ञस्य॒ मात्रां॒ वि मि॑मीत उ त्वः ॥

IAST

ṛ̱cāṃ tva̱: poṣa̍māste pupu̱ṣvāngā̍ya̱traṃ tvo̍ gāyati̱ śakva̍rīṣu.
bra̱hmā tvo̱ vada̍ti jātavi̱dyāṃ ya̱jñasya̱ mātrā̱ṃ vi mi̍mīta u tvaḥ.

English

One plies his constant task reciting verses. one sings the holy psalm in Sakvari measures.
One more, the Brahman, tells the lore of being, and one lays down the rules of sacrificing.

Vedic (Shrauta) yajnas are typically performed by four priests of the Vedic priesthood: the hota, the adhvaryu, the udgata and the Brahma. The functions associated with the priests are:

- The Hotri recites invocations and litanies drawn from the Rigveda.These invocations could consist of single verses (ṛca), strophes (triples called tṛca or pairs called pragātha), or entire hymns (sukta). Hota uses three Rig verses, the introductory verse, the accompanying verse and benediction as the third.
- The Adhvaryu is the priest's assistant and is in charge of the physical details of the ritual (in particular the adhvara, a term for the Somayajna) like measuring the ground, building the altar explained in the Yajurveda. The adhvaryu offers oblations. Each action is accompanied by supplicative or benedictive formulas (yajus), drawn from the yajurveda. Over time, the role of the adhvaryu grew in importance, and many verses of the ṛgveda were incorporated, either intact or adapted, into the texts of the yajurveda.
- The Udgata (udgātṛi) is the chanter of hymns set to melodies and music (sāman) drawn from the Samaveda. The udgatar, like the hota, chants the introductory, accompanying and benediction hymns. This is a specialized role in the major soma sacrifices: a characteristic function of the udgātṛ is to sing hymns in praise of the invigorating properties of soma pavamāna, the freshly pressed juice of the soma plant.
- The Brahman is the superintendent of the entire performance, and is responsible for correcting mistakes by means of supplementary verses taken from the Atharva Veda.

The term Brahman in the above hymn 2.1.2 refers to deity Agni of hymn 2.1.1.

The rgvedic Brahmanas, Aitareya and Kausitaki, specify seven hotrakas to recite shastras (litanies): hotṛ, brāhmanācchamsin, maitrāvaruna, potṛ, neṣṭṛ, agnīdh and acchāvāka. They also carry a legend to explain the origin of the offices of the subrahmanya and the grāvastut.

=== Purohita ===
The requirements of the fully developed ritual were rigorous enough that only professional priests could perform them adequately. Thus, whereas in the earliest times, the true sacrificer, or intended beneficiary of the rite, might have been a direct participant, in Vedic times he was only a sponsor, the yajamāna, with the hotṛ or brahman taking his stead in the ritual. In this seconding lay the origins of the growing importance of the purohita (literally, "one who is placed in front"). It was not unusual for a purohita to be the hotṛ or brahman at a sacrifice for his master, besides conducting other more domestic (gṛhya) rituals for him also. In latter days, with the disappearance of Vedic ritual practice, purohita has become a generic term for "priest".

== Assistants ==
In the systematic expositions of the shrauta sutras, which date to the fifth or sixth century BCE, the assistants are classified into four groups associated with each of the four chief priests, although the classifications are artificial and in some cases incorrect:

- With the hotṛ:
  - the maitrāvaruna
  - the acchāvāka
  - the grāvastut (praising the Soma stones)
- With the udgātṛ:
  - the prastotṛ (who chants the Prastâva)
  - the pratihartṛ ("averter")
  - the subrahmanya
- With the adhvaryu:
  - the pratiprasthātṛ
  - the neṣṭṛ
  - the unnetṛ (who pours the Soma juice into the receptacles )
- With the brahman:
  - the brāhmanācchamsin
  - the agnīdh (priest who kindles the sacred fire)
  - the potṛ ("purifier")

== Philological comparisons ==
Comparison with the sacred texts of Zoroastrianism, a distinct religion with the same origins, shows the antiquity of terms for priests such as *atharwan (Vedic atharvan; cognate to Avestan āθrauuan/aθaurun) and *zhautar (Ved. hotar; Av. zaotar) 'invoker, sacrificer'. While *zhautar is well understood, the original meaning of *atharwan is unknown. The word atharvan appears in the Rig Veda (e.g., in RV 6.16.13 where Agni is said to have been churned by Atharvan from the mind of every poet). In the Younger Avesta, āθrauuan/aθaurun appears in a context that suggests "missionary," perhaps by metathesis from Indo-Iranian *arthavan "possessing purpose." However, a recent theory indicates that Proto Indo-Iranian *atharwan likely represents a substrate word from the unknown language of the BMAC civilization of Central Asia. It can be analyzed as BMAC *athar- plus the Indo-Iranian possessive suffix *-wan, in which case *atharwan would be "one who possesses *athar". Though the meaning of *athar is unknown, Pinault speculates that it meant "superior force" and connects it to the Tocharian word for "hero". In the Upanishads, atharvan appears for example in atharvāngiras, a compound of atharvan and angiras, either two eponymous rishis or their family names.

In present-day Indian Zoroastrian (Parsi) tradition the word athornan is used to distinguish the priesthood from the laity (the behdin). These subdivisions (in the historical Indian context, castes), and the terms used to describe them, are relatively recent developments specific to Indian Zoroastrians and although the words themselves are old, the meaning that they came to have for the Parsis are influenced by their centuries-long coexistence with Hinduism. It appears then that the Indian Zoroastrian priests re-adopted the older āθrauuan/aθaurun (in preference to the traditional, and very well attested derivative āsron) for its similarity to Hinduism's atharvan, which the Parsi priests then additionally assumed was derived from Avestan ātar 'fire'. This folk etymology may "have been prompted by what is probably a mistaken assumption of the importance of fire in the ancient Indo-Iranian religion".

The division of priestly functions among the Hotar, the Udgatar and the Adhvaryu has been compared to the Celtic priesthood as reported by Strabo, with the Druids as high priests, the Bards doing the chanting and the Vates performing the actual sacrifice.

== See also ==
- Agnihotra
- Agnistoma
- Brahmin
- Namboothiri
- Śrāddha
