= Śrauta =

Sanskrit word that means "belonging to śruti"

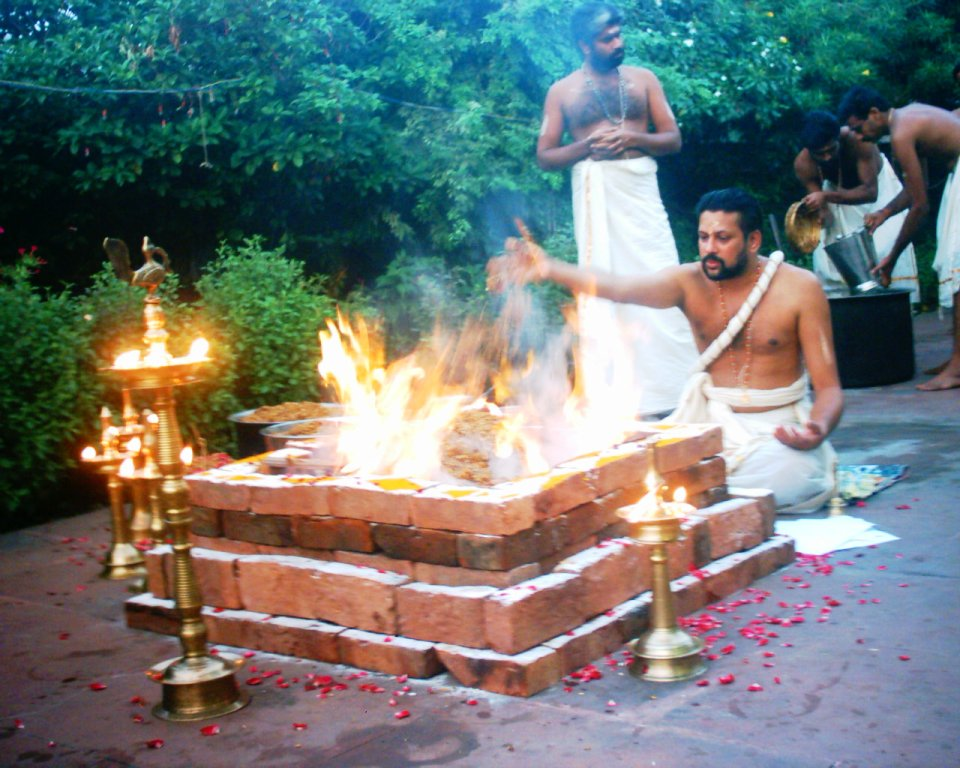
Nambūdiri Brahmins performing śrauta homa rites

Śrauta (Sanskrit: श्रौत) is a Sanskrit word that means "belonging to śruti", that is, anything based on the Vedas of Hinduism. It is an adjective and prefix for texts, ceremonies or persons associated with śruti. The term, for example, refers to Brahmins who specialise in the śruti corpus of texts, and Śrauta Brahmin traditions in modern times can be seen in Kerala and Coastal Andhra.

== Etymology and meaning ==
The Sanskrit word śrauta is rooted in śruti ("that which is heard", referring to scriptures of Hinduism). Johnson says that śrauta is an adjective that is applied to a text, a ritual practice, or a person, that is associated with śruti. Klostermaier concurs, stating that the prefix means "belonging to śruti", and includes ceremonies and texts related to śruti. The word is sometimes spelled shrauta in scholarly literature.

== History ==
Spread via Indian religions, homa traditions are found all across Asia, from Samarkand to Japan, over a 3000-year history. A homa, in all its Asian variations, is a ceremonial ritual that offers food to fire and is ultimately descended from the Vedic religion. The tradition reflects a ritual eclecticism for fire and cooked food (Paka-yajna) that developed in Indian religions, and the Brahmana layers of the Vedas are the earliest surviving records of this.

Yajna or vedic fire sacrifice ritual, in Indian context, became a distinct feature of the early śruti (Vedic) rituals. A śrauta ritual is a form of quid pro quo where through the fire ritual, a sacrificer offered something to the gods, and the sacrificer expected something in return. The Vedic ritual consisted of sacrificial offerings of something edible or drinkable, such as milk, clarified butter, yoghurt, rice, barley, an animal, or anything of value, offered to the gods with the assistance of fire priests. This Vedic tradition split into Śrauta (śruti-based) and Smarta (Smriti-based).

The Śrauta rituals, states Michael Witzel, are an active area of study and are incompletely understood.

Śrauta "fire ritual" practices were copied by different Buddhist and Jain traditions, states Phyllis Granoff, with their texts appropriating the "ritual eclecticism" of Hindu traditions, albeit with variations that evolved through the medieval times. The homa-style Vedic sacrifice ritual, states Musashi Tachikawa, was absorbed into Mahayana Buddhism and homa rituals continue to be performed in some Buddhist traditions in Tibet, China and Japan.

== Texts ==
Śrautasutras texts containing Kalpa sutras known
Veda	Sutras
Rigveda	Asvalayana-sutra (§), Sankhayana-sutra (§), Saunaka-sutra (¶)
Samaveda	Latyayana-sutra (§), Drahyayana-sutra (§), Nidana-sutra (§), Pushpa-sutra (§), Anustotra-sutra (§)
Yajurveda	Manava-sutra (§), Bharadvaja-sutra (¶), Vadhuna-sutra (¶), Vaikhanasa-sutra (¶), Laugakshi-sutra (¶), Maitra-sutra (¶), Katha-sutra (¶), Varaha-sutra (¶), Apastamba-sutra (§), Baudhayana-sutra (§)
Atharvaveda	Kusika-sutra (§)
¶: only quotes survive; §: text survives

Śrautasūtras are ritual-related sutras based on the śruti. The first versions of the Kalpa (Vedanga) sutras were probably composed by the sixth century BCE, starting about the same time as the Brahmana layer of the Vedas were composed and most ritual sutras were complete by around 300 BCE. They were attributed to famous Vedic sages in the Hindu tradition. These texts are written aphoristic sutras style, and therefore are taxonomies or terse guidebooks rather than detailed manuals or handbooks for any ceremony.

The Śrautasūtras differ from the smārtasūtra based on smṛti (that which is remembered, traditions). The Smartasutras, in ancient vedic and post-vedic literature, typically refer to the gṛhyasūtras (householder's rites of passage) and sāmayācārikasūtras (right way to live one's life with duties to self and to relationships with others, dharmaśāstras).

=== Śrauta Sutras ===
Verses 1–2 of the Baudhayāna śulbasūtra state that the squares of any rectangle's width and length add up to the square of its diagonal. This is known in Eastern Mediterranean literature as the Pythagorean theorem.

The Śrautasūtras form a part of the corpus of Sanskrit sutra literature. Their topics include instructions relating to the use of the śruti corpus in great rituals and the correct performance of these major vedic ceremonies, are same as those found in the Brahmana layers of the Vedas, but presented in more systematic and detailed manner.

Definition of a Vedic sacrifice

Yajña, sacrifice, is an act by which we surrender something for the sake of the gods. Such an act must rest on a sacred authority (āgama), and serve for man's salvation (śreyortha). The nature of the gift is of less importance. It may be cake (puroḍāśa), pulse (karu), mixed milk (sāṃnāyya), an animal (paśu), the juice of soma-plant (soma), etc; nay, the smallest offerings of butter, flour, and milk may serve for the purpose of a sacrifice.

— Apastamba Yajna Paribhasa-sutras 1.1, Translator: M Dhavamony

Baudhayana srautasutra is probably the oldest text in the śrautasūtra genre, and includes in its appendix a paribhāṣāsūtra (definitions, glossary section). Other texts such as the early Apastamba śrautasūtra and later composed Katyayana start with Paribhasa-sutra section. The śulbasūtras or śulvasūtras are appendices in the śrautasūtras and deal with the mathematical methodology to construct geometries for the vedi (Vedic altar). The Sanskrit word śulba means "cord", and these texts are "rules of the cord". They provide, states Kim Plofker, what in modern mathematical terminology would be called "area preserving transformations of plane figures", tersely describing geometric formulae and constants. Five śulbasutras have survived through history, of which the oldest surviving is likely the Baudhayāna śulbasūtra (800–500 BCE), while the one by Kātyāyana may be chronologically the youngest (≈300 BCE).

== Rituals ==
Śrauta rituals and ceremonies refer to those found in the Brahmana layers of the Vedas. These include rituals related to fire, full moon, new moon, soma, animal sacrifice, as well as seasonal offerings made during Vedic times. These rituals and ceremonies in the Brahmanas texts are mixed and difficult to follow. A clearer description of the ritual procedures appeared in the Vedanga Kalpa-sutras.

The Vedic rituals, states Burde, can be "divided into Śrauta and Gṛhya rituals". Śrauta rites relating to public ceremonies were relegated to the Śrautasutras, while most Vedic rituals relating to rites of passage and household ceremonies were incorporated in the Gṛhyasūtras (literally, homely; also called Laukika or popular, states Lubin). However, the Gṛhyasūtras also added many new non-Śrauta ceremonies over time. The śrautasūtras generally focus on large expensive public ceremonies, while gṛhyasūtras focus on householders and saṃskāras (rites of passage) such as childbirth, marriage, renunciation and cremation.

The śrautasūtra ceremonies are usually elaborate and require the services of multiple priests, while gṛhyasūtra rituals can be performed without or with the assistance of a priest in the Hindu traditions.

=== Animal versus vegetarian sacrificial offerings ===
The Śrauta rituals varied in complexity. The first step of a Śrauta ritual was making of an altar, then the initiation of fire, next of Havir-yajnas recitations, then offering of milk or drinkable liquid drops into the fire, then prayers all with mantras.

More complex Śrauta rituals were based on moon's cycle (Darshapurnamasa) and the seasonal rituals. The lunar cycle Śrauta sacrifices had no animal sacrifices, offered a Purodasha (baked grain cake) and Ghee (clarified butter) as an offering to gods, with recitation of mantras.

According to Witzel, "the Pasubandha or "Animal Sacrifice" is also integrated into the Soma ritual, and involves the killing of an animal." The killing was considered inauspicious, and "bloodless" suffocation of the animal outside the offering grounds was practiced. The killing was viewed as a form of evil and pollution (papa, agha, enas), and reforms were introduced to avoid this evil in late/post-Rigvedic times. According to Timothy Lubin, the substitution of animal sacrifice in Śrauta ritual with shaped dough (pistapasu) or pots of ghee (ajyapasu) has been practiced for at least 600 years, although such a substitution is not condoned in Śrauta ritual texts.

Shatapatha Brahmana section 1.2.3 of the Yajurveda is generally misinterpreted by modern day indologists as transition from animals to vegetarian offering. However a very careful examination of these verses reveal that these are not vegetarian substitutes for the entire animal but only for those animal organs not offered in fire. Further not a single commentator from mimamsa or vaishnava traditions have talked about any vegetarian substitutes and hence it is clear that vedic animal sacrifices continued as late as 21st century

=== Decline ===
According to Alexis Sanderson, Śrauta ceremonies declined from the fifth to the thirteenth century CE. This period saw a shift from Śrauta sacrifices to charitable grant of gifts such as giving cows, land, issuing endowments to build temples and sattrani (feeding houses), and water tanks as part of religious ceremonies.

=== Contemporary practices ===
Most Śrauta rituals are rarely performed in the modern era. Some Śrauta traditions have been observed and studied by scholars, as in the rural parts of Andhra Pradesh, and elsewhere in India and Nepal. Śrauta traditions from Coastal Andhra have been reported by David Knipe, and an elaborate śrauta ceremony was video recorded in Kerala by Frits Staal in 1975. According to Axel Michaels, the homa sacrifice rituals found in modern Hindu and Buddhist contexts evolved as a simpler version of the Vedic Śrauta ritual.

Knipe has published a book on Śrauta practices from rural Andhra. The Śrauta ritual system, states Knipe, "is an extended one, in the sense that a simple domestic routine has been replaced by one far more demanding on the religious energies of the sacrificer and his wife," and is initiated by augmenting a family's single fire Grihya system to a three fire Śrauta system. The community that continues to teach the Śrauta tradition to the next generation also teaches the Smarta tradition, the choice left to the youth. The Andhra tradition may be, states Knipe, rooted in the ancient Apstamba Śrauta and Grihya Sutras. In the Andhra traditions, after one has established the routine of the twice-daily routine of agnihotra offerings and biweekly dara pūrṇamāsa offerings, one is eligible to perform the agniṣṭoma, the simplest soma rite. After the agniṣṭoma, one is eligible to perform more extensive soma rites and agnicayana rites.

The first soma Śrauta ritual to be conducted outside of South Asia was in London, the United Kingdom in 1996 by a Puṣṭimārga mahārāj who employed south Indian priests. The sacrifice was described by Smith to be a "ludicrous debacle" in terms of adherence to ritual rules.

Śrauta brahmins specialise in conducting rituals according to the śruti corpus of texts, in contrast to smarta brahmins, known for conducting rituals according to smriti texts.

=== Defunct practices ===
The Ashvamedha and Rajasuya are not practiced anymore. There is doubt the Purushamedha, a human sacrifice, was ever performed.

== Influence ==
The Śrauta rituals were complex and expensive, states Robert Bellah, and "we should not forget that the rites were created for royalty and nobility". A Brahmin, adds Bellah, would need to be very rich to sponsor and incur the expense of an elaborate Śrauta rite. In ancient times, through the middle of 1st millennium CE, events such as royal consecration sponsored the Śrauta rites, and thereafter they declined as alternative rites such as temple and philanthropic actions became more popular with the royalty.

The Upanishads, states Brian Smith, were a movement towards the demise of the Śrauta-style social rituals and the worldview these rites represented. The Upanishadic doctrines were not a culmination, but a destruction of Vedic ritualism. This had a lasting influence on the Indian religions that gained prominence in the 1st millennium BCE, not only in terms of the Vedanta and other schools of Hindu philosophy that emerged, but also in terms of Buddhist and Jaina influence among the royal class of the ancient Indian society.

In the Upanishads, one might be witnessing the conclusion of Vedism, not in the sense of its culmination but in the sense of its destruction. In the proto-Vedantic view, the universe and ritual order based on resemblance has collapsed, and a very different configuration based on identity has emerged. Upanishadic monism, one might say, blew the lid off a system contained, as well as regulated, by hierarchical resemblance. The formulation of a monistic philosophy of ultimate identity – arguably one indication of Vedism dissipating and reforming into a new systematic vision of the world and its fundamental principles – was born outside the normative classification schema of Vedic social life and became institutionalized as a counterpoint to life in the world.

With time, scholars of ancient India composed Upanishads, such as the Pranagnihotra Upanishad, that evolved the focus from external rituals to self-knowledge and to inner rituals within man. The Pranagnihotra is, states Henk Bodewitz, an internalized direct private ritual that substituted external public Agnihotra ritual (a srauta rite).

This evolution hinged on the Vedic idea of devas (gods) referring to the sense organs within one's body, and that the human body is the temple of Brahman, the metaphysical unchanging reality. This principle is found in many Upanishads, including the Pranagnihotra Upanishad, the Brihadaranyaka Upanishad section 2.2, Kaushitaki Upanishad sections 1.4 and 2.1–2.5, Prasna Upanishad chapter 2, and others. The idea is also found and developed by other minor Upanishads such as the ancient Brahma Upanishad which opens by describing human body as the "divine city of Brahman".

Bodewitz states that this reflects the stage in ancient Indian thought where "the self or the person as a totality became central, with the self or soul as the manifestation of the highest principle or god". This evolution marked a shift in spiritual rite from the external to the internal, from public performance through srauta-like rituals to performance in thought through introspection, from gods in nature to gods within.

The Śrauta Agnihotra sacrifice thus evolved into Prana-Agnihotra sacrifice concept. Heesterman describes the pranagnihotra sacrifice as one where the practitioner performs the sacrifice with food and his own body as the temple, without any outside help or reciprocity, and this ritual allows the Hindu to "stay in the society while maintaining his independence from it", its simplicity thus marks the "end station of Vedic ritualism".

== See also ==
- Vedas
- Mīmāṃsā
- Vaikhanasa
- Vatakalai
- Hinduism
- Vedic period
- Yoga and Yuga
- Hindu cosmology
