= Homa (ritual) =

Fire ritual in Indian religions

In Indian religions, a homa (Sanskrit: होम) or havan, is a fire ritual performed on special occasions. In Hinduism, by a Hindu priest usually for a homeowner (grihastha: one possessing a home). The grihastha keeps different kinds of fire including one to cook food, heat the home, among other uses; therefore, a yajna offering is made directly into the fire. A homa is sometimes called a "sacrifice ritual" because the fire destroys the offering, but a homa is more accurately a "votive ritual". The fire is the agent, and the offerings include those that are material and symbolic such as grains, ghee, milk, incense, and seeds.

It is rooted in the Vedic religion, and was also adopted in ancient times by Buddhism and Jainism. The practice spread from India to Central Asia, East Asia, and Southeast Asia. Homa rituals remain an important part of many Hindu ceremonies, and variations of homa continue to be practiced in current-day Buddhism, particularly in parts of Tibet and Japan. It is also found in modern Jainism.

A homa is also called yajna in Hinduism, sometimes for larger public fire rituals, or jajnavidhana or goma in Buddhism. In modern times, a homa tends to be a private ritual around a symbolic fire, such as those observed at a wedding.

== Etymology ==
The Sanskrit word homa (होम) is from the root hu, which refers to "pouring into fire, offer, sacrifice".

== History ==
Homa traditions are found across Asia, from Samarkand to Japan, over a 3000-year history. A homa, in all its Asian variations, is a ceremonial ritual that offers food to fire and is ultimately linked to the traditions contained in the Vedic religion. The tradition reflects a reverence for fire and cooked food (pākayajña) that developed in Asia, and the Brahmana layers of the Vedas are the earliest records of this ritual reverence.

Inner Homa, body as temple

Therefore the first food which a man may take,
is in the place of Homa.
And he who offers that first oblation,
should offer it to Prana, saying svaha!
Then Prana is satisfied.
If Prana is satisfied, the eye is satisfied.
If eye is satisfied, the sun is satisfied.
If sun is satisfied, heaven is satisfied.

— Chandogya Upanishad 5.19.1–2
Transl: Max Muller

The yajñā or fire sacrifice became a distinct feature of the early śruti rituals. A śrauta ritual is a form of quid pro quo where through the fire ritual, a sacrificer offered something to the gods and goddesses, and the sacrificer expected something in return. The Vedic ritual consisted of sacrificial offerings of something edible or drinkable, such as milk, clarified butter, yoghurt, rice, barley, an animal, or anything of value, offered to the gods with the assistance of fire priests. This Vedic tradition split into śrauta (śruti-based) and Smarta (Smṛti-based).

The homa ritual practices were observed by different Buddhist and Jaina traditions, states Phyllis Granoff, with their texts appropriating the "ritual eclecticism" of Hindu traditions, albeit with variations that evolved through medieval times. The homa-style Vedic sacrifice ritual, states Musashi Tachikawa, was absorbed into Mahayana Buddhism and homa rituals continue to be performed in some Buddhist traditions in Tibet, China, and Japan.

== Hinduism ==
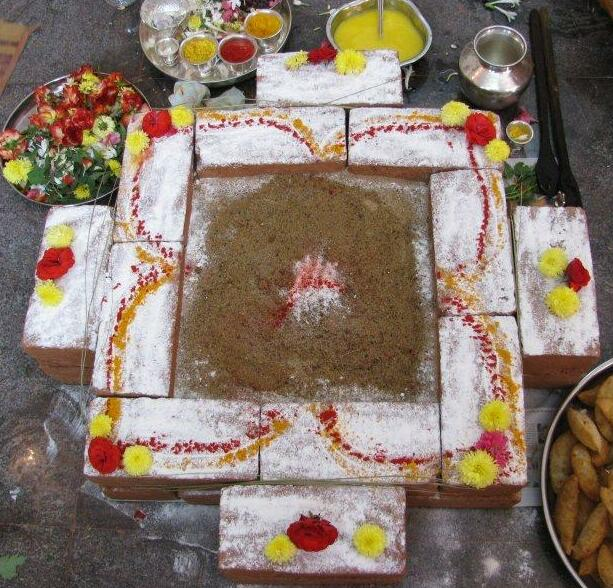
A homa altar with offerings

The homa ritual grammar is common to many samskara (rite of passage) ceremonies in various Hindu traditions. The Vedic fire ritual, at the core of various homa ritual variations in Hinduism, is a "bilaterally symmetrical" structure of a rite. It often combines fire and water, burnt offerings, and soma; fire as masculine, earth and water as feminine, the fire vertical and reaching upward while the altar, offerings, and liquids being horizontal. The homa ritual's altar (fire pit) is itself a symmetry, most often a square, a design principle that is also at the heart of temples and mandapas in Indian religions. The sequence of homa ritual events similarly, from beginning to end, are structured around the principles of symmetry. ).

The fire-altar (vedi or homa/havan kunda) is generally made of brick or stone or a copper vessel, and is almost always built specifically for the occasion, being dismantled immediately afterward. This fire-altar is invariably built in square shape. While very large vedis are occasionally built for major public homas, the usual altar may be as small as one foot square and rarely exceeds three feet square.

A ritual space of homa, the altar is temporary and movable. The first step in a homa ritual is the construction of the ritual enclosure (mandapa), and the last step is its deconstruction. The altar and mandapa is consecrated by a priest, creating a sacred space for the ritual ceremony, with recitation of mantras. With hymns sung, the fire is started, offerings collected. The sacrificer enters, symbolically cleanses himself or herself, with water, joins the homa ritual, gods invited, prayers recited, conch shell blown. The sacrificers pour offerings and libations into the fire, with hymns sung, to the sounds of svaha. The oblations and offerings typically consist of clarified butter (ghee), milk, curd, sugar, saffron, grains, coconut, perfumed water, incense, seeds, petals, and herbs.

The altar and the ritual is a symbolic representation of the Hindu cosmology, a link between reality and the worlds of gods and living beings. The ritual is also a symmetric exchange, a "quid pro quo", wherein humans offer something to the gods through the medium of fire, and in return expect that the gods will reciprocate with strength and that which they have power to influence.

== Buddhism ==
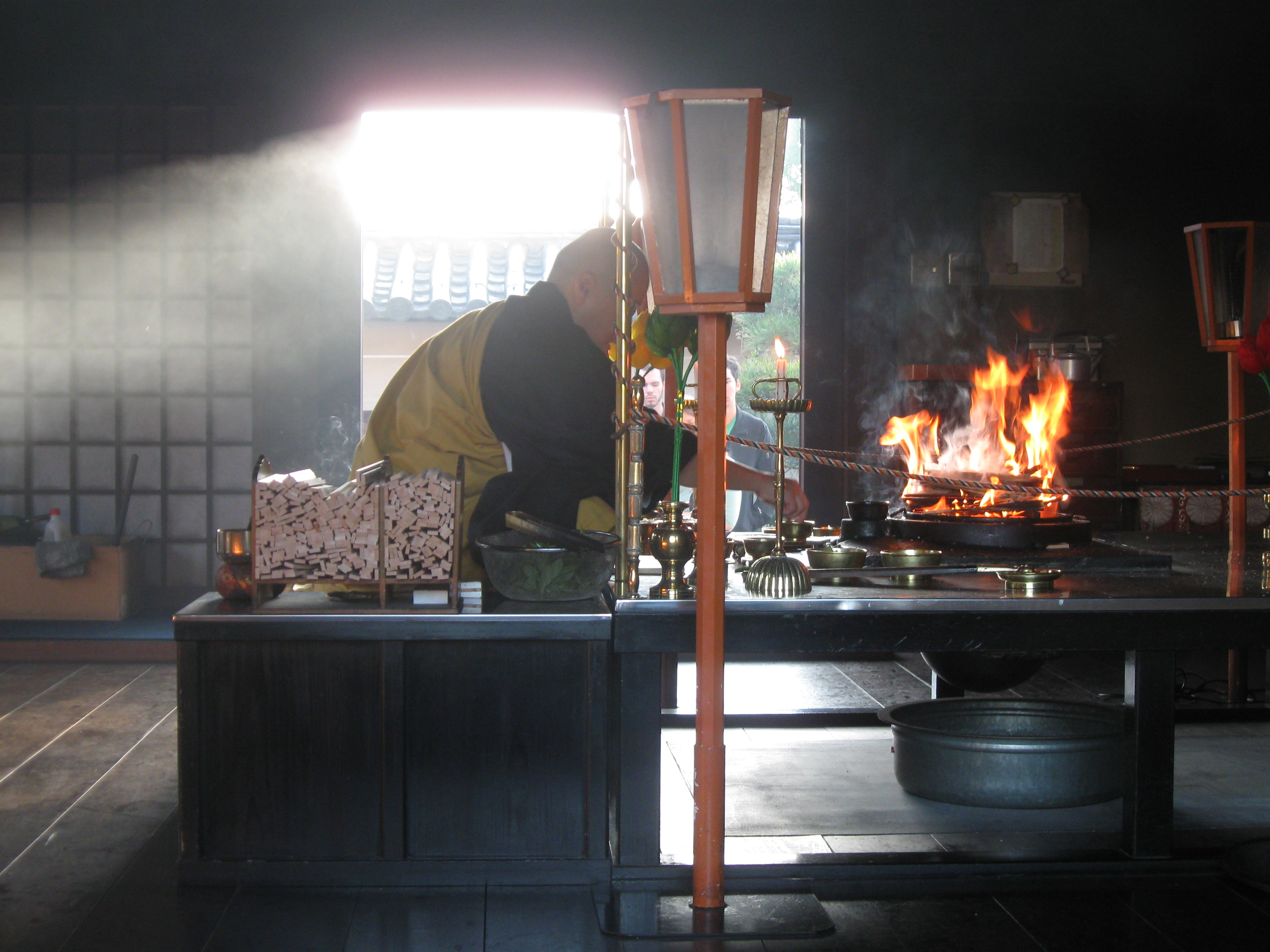
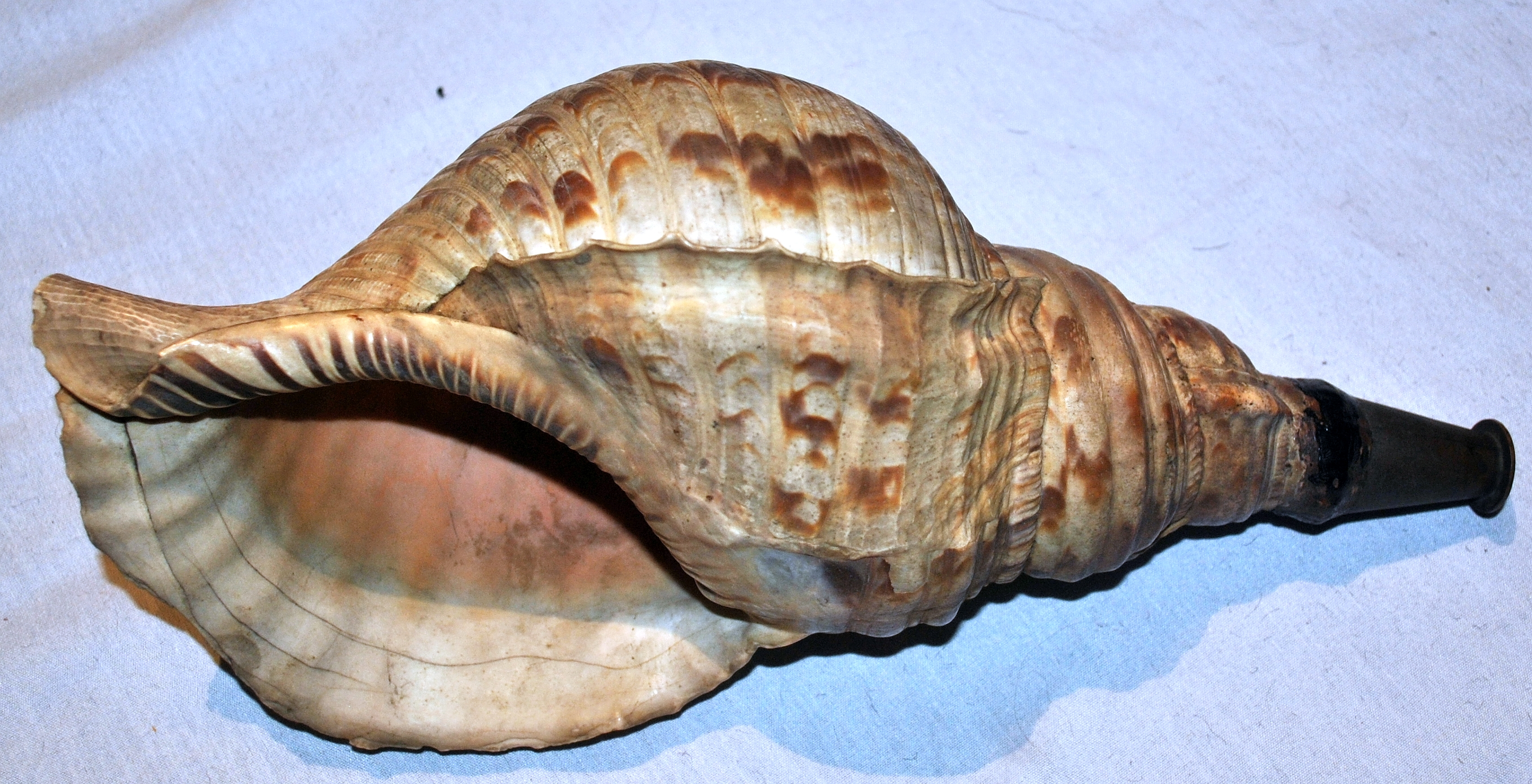
Shingon Buddhist priests practice homa ritual, which sometimes includes beating drums and blowing horagai (lower, conch).

The homa (護摩, goma) ritual of consecrated fire is found in some Buddhist traditions of Tibet, China, and Japan. Its roots are the Vedic ritual, it evokes Buddhist deities, and is performed by qualified Buddhist priests. In Chinese translations of Buddhist texts such as Kutadanta Sutta, Dighanikaya, and Suttanipata, dated to be from the 6th to 8th century, the Vedic homa practice is attributed to Buddha's endorsement along with the claim that Buddha was the original teacher of the Vedas in his previous lives.

In some Buddhist homa traditions, such as in Japan, the central deity invoked in this ritual is usually Acalanātha (Fudō Myōō, 不動明王, lit. "Immovable Wisdom King"). Acalanātha is another name for Vajrapani or Chakdor in Tibetan traditions, and of Sotshirvani in Siberia. The Acala Homa ritual procedure follows similar Vedic protocols found in Hinduism, with offerings into the fire by priests who recite mantras being the main part of the ritual and the devotees clap hands as different rounds of hymns have been recited. Other versions of the homa (goma) rituals are found in Japanese Buddhist traditions, namely Tendai and Shingon, as well as in Shugendō and Buddhist-Shinto syncretism in Japan. In China, the homa ritual was widely performed by the Zhenyan tradition of Chinese Buddhism, and many historical records document its performance especially during the Tang (618-907) and Song dynasties (960-1279).

In most Shingon temples, this ritual is performed daily in the morning or the afternoon, and is a requirement for all acharyas to learn this ritual upon entering the priesthood. The original medieval era texts of the goma rituals are in Siddham Sanskrit seed words and Chinese, with added Japanese katakana to assist the priests in proper pronunciation. Larger scale ceremonies often include multiple priests, chanting, the beating of Taiko drums and blowing of conch shell (horagai) around the mandala with fire as the ceremonial focus. The ritual is also performed in modern Zhenyan temples in China, Taiwan and other Chinese communities after the revival of esoteric lineages via the re-importation of Shingon practices and teachings in contemporary times. Homa rituals (sbyin sreg) widely feature in Tibetan Buddhism and Bön and are linked to a variety of Mahayana Buddhas and tantric deities.

== Jainism ==
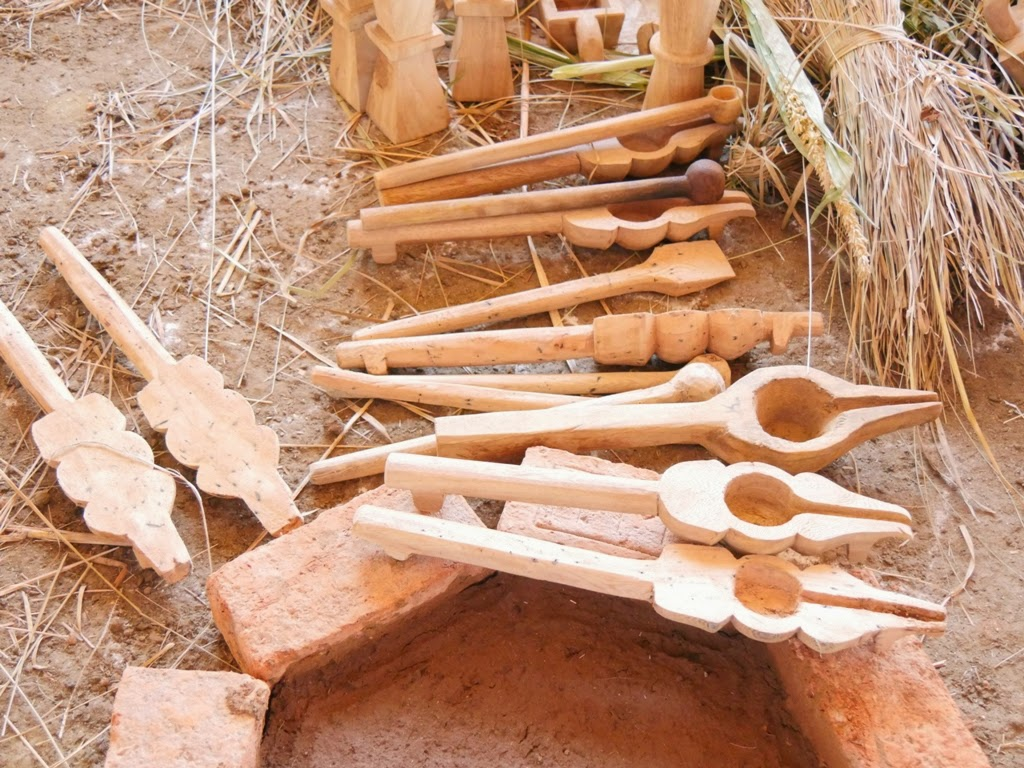
Example of traditional wooden homa and yajna implements used during rituals

Homa rituals are also found in Jainism. For example, the Ghantakarn ritual is a homa sacrifice, which has evolved over the centuries, and where ritual offerings are made into fire, with pancamrit (milk, curd, sugar, saffron, and clarified butter) and other symbolic items such as coconut, incense, seeds, and herbs. The mantra recited by Jains include those in Sanskrit, and the 16th-century Svetambara text Ghantakarna Mantra Stotra is a Sanskrit text which describes the homa ritual dedicated to Ghantakarna Mahavira in one of the Jaina sects.

The Adipurana of Jainism, in section 47.348, describes a Vedic fire ritual in the memory of Rishabha. Traditional Jaina wedding ceremonies, like among the Hindus, is a Vedic fire sacrifice ritual.

== Sikhism ==
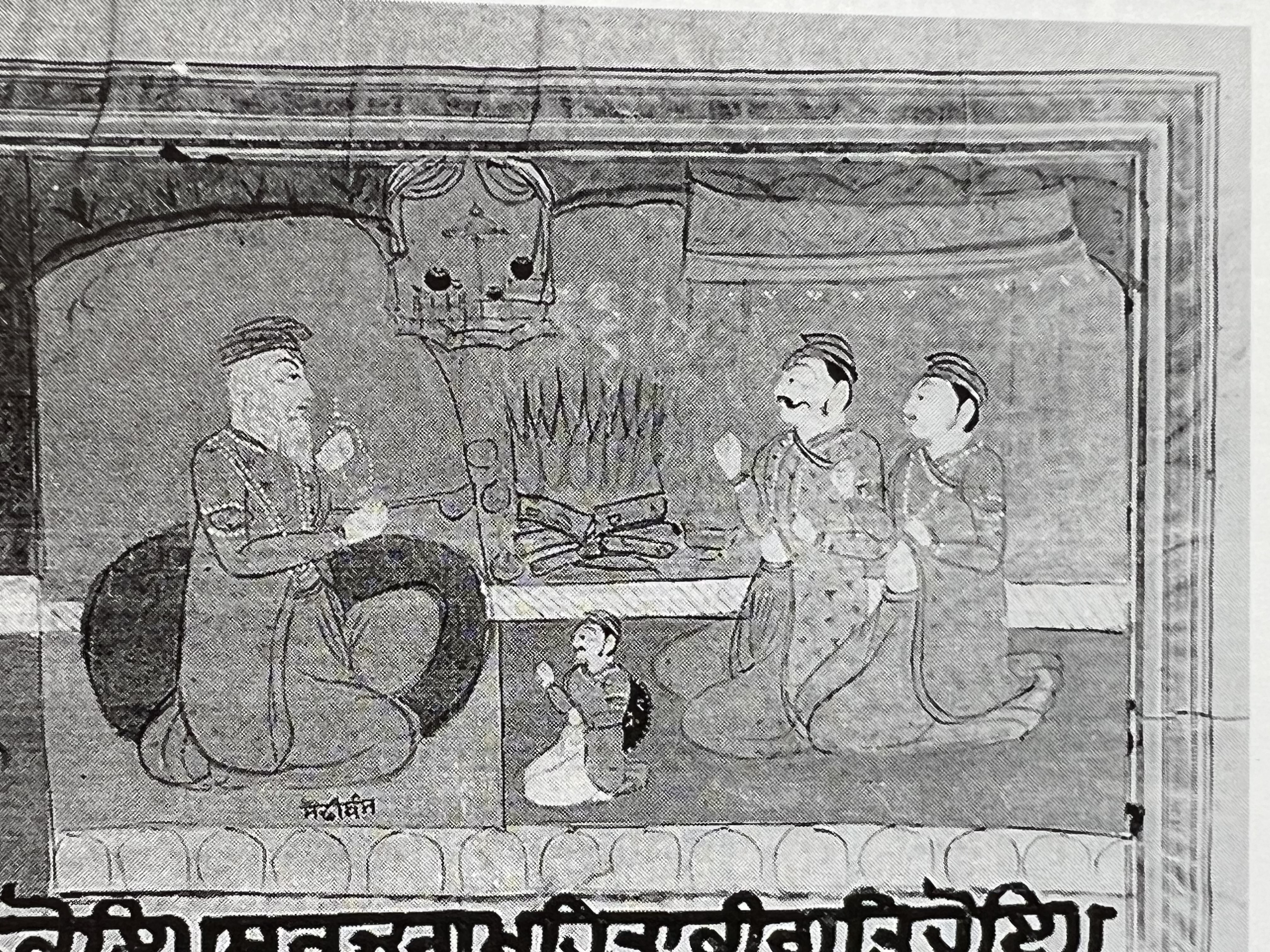
Painting of Sodhi Bhan Singh carrying out a havan, from an illustrated Guru Granth Sahib manuscript painted by Miha Singh of Kashmir, Kashmiri style, ca.1839–43

Yajjna rituals (including homa, havan, and yagya) are rejected by mainstream Sikhs in the modern period. However, Namdhari Sikhs maintain the havan ritual, which they also call jag, which is mentioned in their version of the Rehat Maryada and is believed to have purification and cleansing purposes. The Namdhari havan is performed in the early morning and lasts around forty-five minutes, consisting of kirtan by ragis and the taking of amrit. The ritual is usually done by seven men, five reading verses, one adding incense, and another sprinkling water upon the fire, which burns on an offering of a coconut wrapped in cloth (symbolizing the head of an animal or human sacrifice which is not done now due to the pacifist nature of the Namdharis). The culmination of the ceremony ends with the giving out of karah parshad. Despite Guru Nanak rejecting rituals in favour of inner cultivation, popular worship required the need for outward devotion, leading to the persistence and adoption of the havan by the Namdhari Sikhs. There exists a historical anecdote reiterated by Gokul Chand Narang of Guru Gobind Singh performing a homa ritual to make a devi appear.

== See also ==
- Dhuni
- Holocaust (sacrifice)
- Kupala Night
- Lag BaOmer
- Walpurgis Night
- Yajna
