= Jaiminiya Upanishad Brahmana =

The Jaiminiya Upanishad Brahmana (JUB) (Sanskrit: जैमिनीय उपनिषद्-ब्राह्मण, Jaiminīya Upaniṣad Brāhmaṇa) or the Talavakara Upanishad Brahmana (Sanskrit: तलवकार उपनिषद्-ब्राह्मण, Talavakāra Upaniṣad Brāhmaṇa) is a Vedic text associated with the Jaiminiya or the Talavakara shakha of the Samaveda. It is considered as an Aranyaka. A part of this text forms the Kena Upanishad. Together with the Bṛhadāraṇyaka and Chāndogya Upanishads, it dates to the Brahmana period of Vedic Sanskrit, likely predating the 6th century BCE. This first printed edition of this text, edited by Hanns Oertel along with its translation into English by him was published in the Journal of the American Oriental Society in 1896.

It is not to be confused with the Jaiminiya Brahmana (JB), the actual Brahmana text of the Jaiminiya shakha of the Samaveda.

== See also ==
- Brahmana
