= Shakha =

Hindu theological school

A shakha (Sanskrit: शाखा, romanized: śākhā, lit. 'branch') is a Hindu theological school that specializes in learning certain Vedic texts, or else the traditional texts followed by such a school. An individual follower of a particular school or recension is called a śākhin. The term is also used in Hindu philosophy to refer to an adherent of a particular orthodox system.

A related term caraṇa, ("conduct of life" or "behavior") is also used to refer to such a Vedic school: "although the words caraṇa and śākhā are sometimes used synonymously, yet caraṇa properly applies to the sect or collection of persons united in one school, and śākhā to the traditional text followed, as in the phrase śākhām adhite, ("he recites a particular version of the Veda")". The schools have different points of view, described as "difference of (Vedic) school" (śākhābhedaḥ). Each school would learn a specific Vedic Saṃhita (one of the "four Vedas" properly so-called), as well as its associated Brahmana, Aranyakas, Shrautasutras, Grhyasutras and Upanishads.

In traditional Hindu society affiliation with a specific school is an important aspect of class identity. By the end of the Rig Vedic period the term Brāhmaṇa had come to be applied to all members of the priestly class, but there were subdivisions within this order based both on varna (class) and on the shakha (branch) with which they were affiliated. A Brāhmaṇa who changed school would be called "a traitor to his śākhā" (śākhāraṇḍaḥ).

== Summary of schools ==
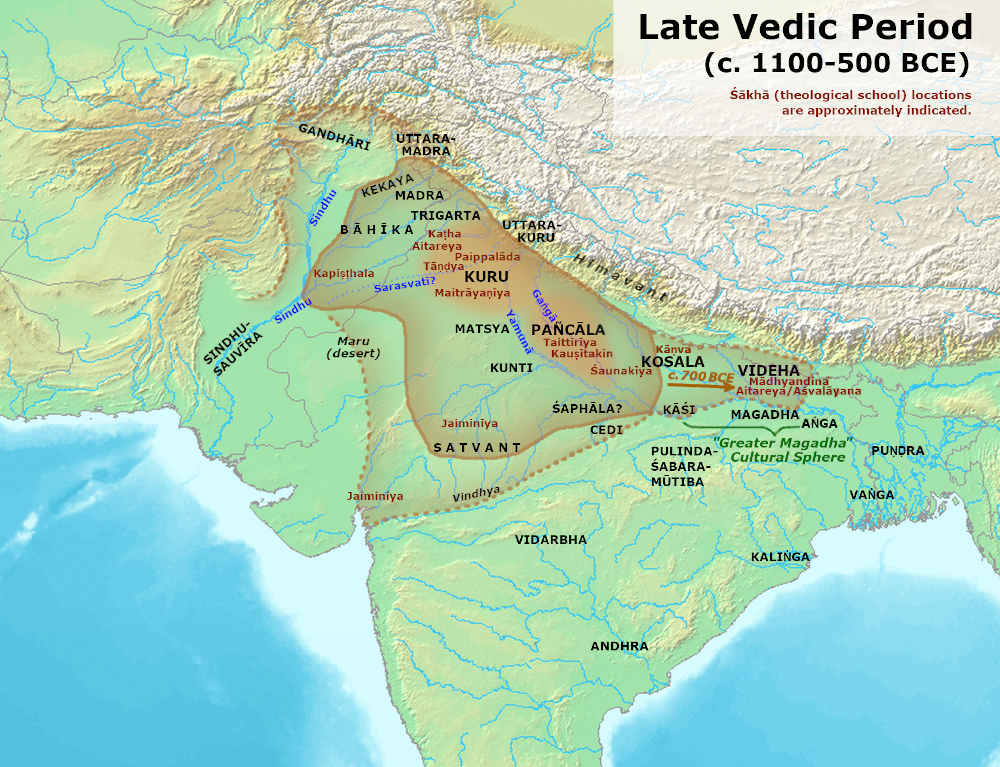
Late Vedic culture (1100-500 BCE), with shakhas shown in red. The Kosala-Magadha region was not considered part of Aryavarta until after Vedic times, despite the presence of sakhas. It constituted a culturally markedly different region, which gave rise to Jainism and Buddhism.

The traditional source of information on the shakhas of each Veda is the Caraṇa-vyūha, of which two, mostly similar, versions exist: the 49th pariśiṣṭa of the Atharvaveda, ascribed to Shaunaka, and the 5th pariśiṣṭa of the Śukla (White) Yajurveda, ascribed to Kātyāyana. These have lists of the numbers of recensions that were believed to have once existed as well as those still extant at the time the works were compiled. Only a small number of recensions have survived.

Saraswati Gangadhar's devotional poetry written in Marathi called Shri Gurucharitra describes different shakhas of 4 Vedas in 27th chapter.

The schools are enumerated below, categorised according to the Veda each expounds.

=== Rigveda ===
Śaunaka's Caraṇa-vyuha lists five shakhas for the Rig Veda, the Śākala, Bāṣkala, Aśvalāyana, Śaṅkhāyana, and Māṇḍukāyana of which only the Śākala and Bāṣkala and very few of Asvalayana are now extant. The Bashkala recension of the Rigveda has the Khilani which are not present in the Shakala text but is preserved in one Kashmir manuscript (now at Pune). The Shakala has the Aitareya-Brahmana, The Bashkala has the Kausitaki-Brahmana.

Shri Gurucharitra mentions 12 shakhas for the Rig Veda namely śrāvakā, śravaṇiyā, jaṭā, śaphaṭa, pāṭhakrama(2), daṇḍa, aśvalāyanī, śāṃkhāyanī, śākalā, bāṣkalā and māṇḍūkā (श्रावका, श्रवणिया, जटा, शफट, पाठक्रम(2), दण्ड, अश्वलायनी, शांखायनी, शाकला, बाष्कला, माण्डूका) in Ovi 35 to 38.

There is, however, Sutra literature from the Aśvalāyana shakha, both a shrauta sutra and a grhya sutra, both surviving with a commentary (vrtti) by Gargya Naranaya. Gargya Naranaya's commentary was based on the longer commentary or bhashya by Devasvamin, written in the 11th century.

The Śaṅkhāyana shakha has been recently rediscovered in Banswada in Rajasthan where two septuagenarians are the last surviving practitioners.

Shakha	Samhita	Brahmana	Aranyaka	Upanishad
Shakala		Aitreya Samhita	Aitreya Aranyaka	Aitreya Upanishad

=== Yajurveda ===
Śaunaka's Caraṇa-vyuha lists forty-two or forty-four out of eighty-six shakhas for the Yajur Veda, but that only five of these are now extant, with a sixth partially extant. For the Yajur Veda the five (partially in six) shakhas are the (Vajasaneyi Madhandina, Kanva; Taittiriya, Maitrayani, Caraka-Katha, Kapisthala-Katha).

The Yajurvedin shakhas are divided in Shukla (White) and Krishna (Black) schools. The White recensions have separate Brahmanas, while the Black ones have their(much earlier) Brahmanas interspersed between the Mantras.

- Shukla Yajurveda: Vājasaneyi Samhita Madhyandina (VSM), Vājasaneyi Samhita Kānva (VSK): Shatapatha Brahmana (ShBM, ShBK)
- Krishna Yajurveda: Taittirīya Saṃhita (TS) with an additional Brahmana, Taittiriya Brahmana (TB), Maitrayani Saṃhita (MS), Caraka-Katha Saṃhita (KS), Kapiṣṭhala-Katha Saṃhita (KapS).

==== Shukla ====
Shakha	Samhita	Brahmana	Aranyaka	Upanishad
Madhyandina (VSM)	Currently recited by all over North Indian Brahmins and by Deshastha Brahmins, and Yajurvedi Shrimali Brahmins	Madhyandina Shatapatha (SBM)	survives as Shatapatha XIV.1-8, with accents.	Brihadaranyaka Upanishad = SBM XIV. 3–8, with accents, Ishavasya Upanishad = VSM 40
Kanva (VSK)	Currently recited by Utkala Brahmins, Kannada Brahmins, some Karhade Brahmins and few Iyers	Kanva Shatapatha (SBK)(different from madhyandina)	survives as book XVII of SBK	Brihadaranyaka Upanishad=SBK, with accents, Ishavasya Upanishad = VSK 40
Katyayana			-	-

==== Krishna ====
Shakha	Samhita	Brahmana	Aranyaka	Upanishad
Taittiriya	TS, Present all over India and in Konkan recited by Chitpavan Brahmins	Taittiriya Brahmana (TB) and Vadhula Br. (part of Vadhula Srautrasutra)	Taittiriya Aranyaka (TA)	Taittiriya Upanishad (TU)
Maitrayani	MS, Recited by few Brahmins in Nasik	-	virtually same as the Upanishad	Maitrayaniya Upanishad
Caraka-Katha			Katha Aranyaka (almost the entire text from a solitary manuscript)	Kathaka Upanishad, Katha-Shiksha Upanishad
Kapishthala	KapS (fragmentary manuscript, only first sections accented), edited (without accents) by Raghu Vira.		-	-

=== Samaveda ===
Śaunaka's Caraṇa-vyuha lists twelve shakhas for the Sama Veda out of a thousand that are said to have once existed, but that of these only one or perhaps two are still extant. The two Samaveda recensions are the Jaiminiya and Kauthuma.

In Ovi 203 to 210 of chapter 27, Shri Gurucharitra mentions 8 of the thousands of shakhas namely āsurāyaṇīyā, vāsurāyaṇīya़ā, vātāntareyā, prāṃjalī, ṛjñagvainavidhā, prācīna yogyaśākhā, jñānayoga and rāṇāyaṇīyā (आसुरायणीया, वासुरायणीय़ा, वातान्तरेया, प्रांजली, ऋज्ञग्वैनविधा, प्राचीन योग्यशाखा, ज्ञानयोग, राणायणीया). Of these rāṇāyaṇīyā (राणायणीया) has 10 shakhas namely rāṇāyaṇīyā, sāṃkhyāyanī, śāṭhyā, mugdala, khalvalā, mahākhalvalā, lāṅ‌galā, kaithumā, gautamā and jaiminī (राणायणीया, सांख्यायनी, शाठ्या, मुग्दल, खल्वला, महाखल्वला, लाङ्‌गला, कैथुमा, गौतमा, जैमिनी).

The Kauthuma shakha has the PB, SadvB, the Jaiminiya shakha has the Jaiminiya Brahmana.

Shakha	Samhita	Brahmana	Aranyaka	Upanishad
Kauthuma	Recited by all over North and in South India as well as Samvedi Shrimali Brahmins of Western India	edited (8 Brahmanas in all), no accents	None. The Samhita itself has the ‘Aranyaka’.	Chandogya Upanishad
Ranayaniya	Manuscripts of Samhita exist.Recited by Gokarna, and Deshastha Brahmins	Same as Kauthuma with minor differences.	None. The Samhita itself has the ‘Aranyaka’.	Same as Kauthuma.
Jaiminiya/Talavakara	Samhita edited.Recited by Nambudiris and choliyal of Tamil Nadu Two distinct styles of Saman recitation, partially recorded and published.	Brahmana published (without accents) – Jaiminiya Brahmana, Arsheya Brahmana	Tamil Nadu version of Talavakara Aranyaka (=Jaiminiya Upanishad Brahmana) published	Kena Upanishad
Shatyayana			-	-

=== Atharvaveda ===
Only one shakha of an original nine is now extant for the Atharvaveda. The nine sakhas were Paippalada, Tauda, Mauda, Shaunakiya, Jajala, Jalada, Brahmavada, Devadarsa and Chaarana-Vaidya. In Ovi 217 to 219 of chapter 27, Shri Gurucharitra mentions 9 shakhas namely paippalā, dāntā, pradāṃta, stotā, autā, brahmadā yaśadā, śaunakī, vedadarśā and caraṇavidyā (पैप्पला, दान्ता, प्रदांत, स्तोता, औता, ब्रह्मदा यशदा, शौनकी, वेददर्शा, चरणविद्या).

The Shaunaka is the only shakha of the Atharvaveda for which both printed texts and an active oral tradition are known to still exist.

For the Atharvaveda, both the Shaunakiya and the Paippalada traditions contain textual corruptions, and the original text of the Atharvaveda may only be approximated from comparison between the two.

Shakha	Samhita	Brahmana	Aranyaka	Upanishad
Shaunaka	AVS, edited and recited by all over North India and South India	Fragmentary Gopatha Brahmana (extant and published), no accents.	-	Mundaka Upanishad (?) published.
Paippalada	AVP; recited by Utkala Brahmins as samhita patha only. otherwise, two manuscripts survive: Kashmiri (mostly edited) and Oriya (partly edited, by Dipak Bhattacharya and others, unaccented)	lost, similar to that of Gopatha Brahmana	-	Prashna Upanishad, Sharabha Upanishad etc. – all edited.

The Paippalada tradition was discontinued, and its text is known only from manuscripts collected since the 20th century. However some Orissa Brahmins still continue the tradition of Paippalada. No Brahmana is known for the Shaunaka shakha. The Paippalada is possibly associated with the Gopatha Brahmana.
