= Aranyaka =

Part of the ancient Indian Vedas

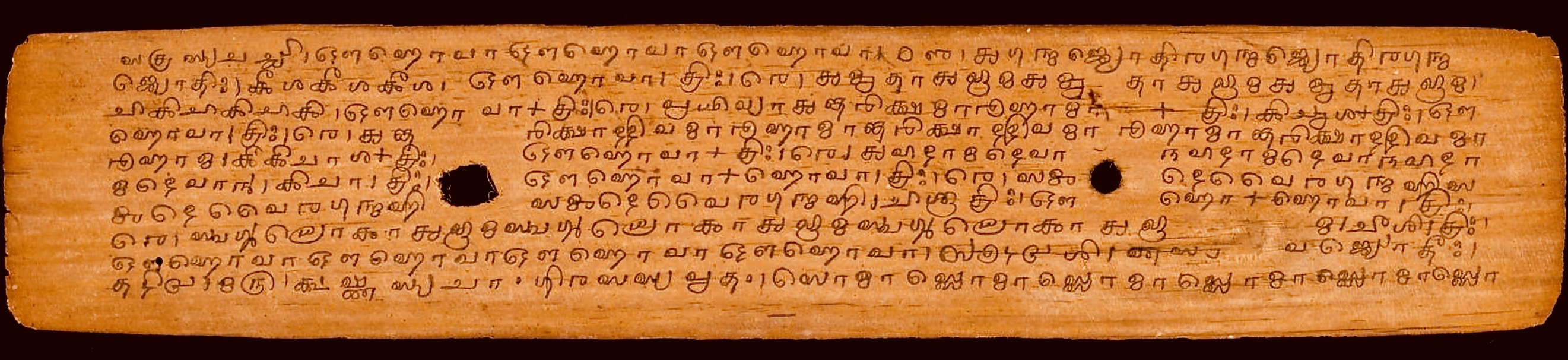
A page of the Jaiminiya Aranyaka Gana found embedded in the Samaveda palm leaf manuscript (Sanskrit, Grantha script).

The Aranyakas (/ɑːˈrənjəkəz/; Sanskrit: आरण्यक; IAST: āraṇyaka) are a part of the ancient Indian Vedas concerned with the meaning of ritual sacrifice, composed in about 700 BCE. They typically represent the later sections of the Vedas, and are one of many layers of Vedic texts. The other parts of the Vedas are the Samhitas (benedictions, hymns), Brahmanas (commentary), and the Upanishads (spirituality and abstract philosophy).

Aranyakas describe and discuss rituals from various perspectives; some include philosophical speculations. For example, the Katha Aranyaka discusses rituals connected with the Pravargya. The Aitareya Aranyaka includes explanation of the Mahavrata ritual from ritualisitic to symbolic meta-ritualistic points of view. Aranyakas, however, neither are homogeneous in content nor in structure. Aranyakas are sometimes identified as karma-kanda (कर्मकाण्ड), ritualistic action/sacrifice section, while the Upanishads are identified as jnana-kanda (ज्ञानकाण्ड) knowledge/spirituality section. In an alternate classification, the early part of Vedas are called Samhitas and the ritualistic commentary on the mantras and rituals are called the Brahmanas which together are identified as the ceremonial karma-kanda, while Aranyakas and Upanishads are referred to as the jnana-kanda.

In the immense volume of ancient Indian Vedic literature, there is no absolute universally true distinction between Aranyakas and Brahmanas. Similarly, there is no absolute distinction between Aranyakas and Upanishads, as some Upanishads are incorporated inside a few Aranyakas. Aranyakas, along with Brahmanas, represent the emerging transitions in later Vedic religious practices. The transition completes with the blossoming of ancient Indian philosophy from external sacrificial rituals to internalized philosophical treatise of Upanishads.

== Etymology ==
"Aranyaka" (āraṇyaka) literally means "produced, born, relating to a forest" or rather, "belonging to the wilderness". It is derived from the word Araṇya (अरण्य), which means "wilderness".

Several theories have been proposed on the origin of the word Aranyaka. Originally, as per Oldenberg (1915), it meant dangerous texts to be studied in the wilderness (Taitt. Ar. II). A later, post-Vedic theory holds that these texts were meant to be studied in a forest, while the other holds that the name came from these being the manuals of allegorical interpretation of sacrifices, for those in Vanaprastha (retired, forest-dwelling) stage of their life, however the Vanaprastha Ashrama came into existence only well after that of the Sanyasin (Sprockhoff 1976), according to the historic age-based Ashrama system of human life. Four Ashrams consist of Brhmacharya up to 25 years for learning and grooming for life; Gruhastha from 26 to 50 years for marriage and worldly activities; Vanaprastha from ages 51 to 75 when a person/couple retire from active family/social life and devote time in religious, philosophical pursuit. It is so named after Vana-Forest life by moving to the forest. From age 75 till the end of life, persons live lives of an ascetic, contemplating on supernatural, pure philosophy, accepting whatever is available for sustaining life. It is mostly for helping the society in whatever manner possible, giving the benefit of long experience and knowledge accumulated during the lifetime.

Taittiriya Ar. 2 says, "from where one cannot see the roofs of the settlement", which does not indicate a forested area.

== Discussion ==
=== Structure ===
Aranyakas are diverse in their structure. Jan Gonda summarizes:

The structure of the Aranyakas is as little homogenous as their contents. Some portions have the character of a Samhita, others of a Brahmana, others again of a Sutra, according to the material that, varying from Veda to Veda, and from school to school, was collected in an Aranyaka corpus. Linguistically and stylistically also, these works form a transition between the Brahmanas proper and the speculative literature that follows them and develops part of the ideas and lines of thought which are characteristic of them.

— Jan Gonda, Vedic Literature

Many Aranyaka texts enumerate mantras, identifications, etymologies, discussions, myths and symbolic interpretations, but a few such as by sage Arunaketu include hymns with deeper philosophical insights.

=== Contents ===
The Aranyakas discuss sacrifices, in the language and style of the Brahmanas, and thus are primarily concerned with the proper performance of ritual (orthopraxy). The Aranyakas were restricted to a particular class of rituals that nevertheless were frequently included in the Vedic curriculum.

The Aranyakas are associated with, and named for, individual Vedic shakhas.

- Rigveda
  - Aitareya Aranyaka belongs to the Aitareya Shakha of Rigveda
  - Kaushitaki Aranyaka belongs to the Kaushitaki and Shankhayana Shakhas of Rigveda
- Yajurveda
  - Taittiriya Aranyaka belongs to the Taittiriya Shakha of the Krishna Yajurveda
  - Maitrayaniya Aranyaka belongs to the Maitrayaniya Shakha of the Krishna Yajurveda
  - Katha Aranyaka belongs to the (Caraka)Katha Shakha of the Krishna Yajurveda
  - Brihad Aranyaka in the Madhyandina and the Kanva versions of the Shukla Yajurveda. The Madhyandina version has 9 sections, of which the last 6 are the Brihadaranyaka Upanishad.
- Samaveda
  - Talavakara Aranyaka or Jaiminiya Upanishad Brahmana belongs to the Talavakara or Jaiminiya Shakha of the Samaveda. A part of this text forms the Kena Upanishad.
  - Aranyaka Samhita is not a typical Aranyaka text: rather the Purvarchika of the Samaveda Samhitas has a section of mantras, called the 'Aranyaka Samhita', on which the Aranyagana Samans are sung.

The Atharvaveda has no surviving Aranyaka, though the Gopatha Brahmana is regarded as its Aranyaka, a remnant of a larger, lost Atharva (Paippalada) Brahmana.

=== Aitareya Aranyaka ===
Human beings

But only in human beings is the Atman [soul] obvious,
for they are equipped with cognition.
They speak what they have understood.
They see what they have recognized,
and know what will exist tomorrow.
They know of this world and of the other.
Through that which is mortal, they strive for immortality.
They are equipped with all this...
such a human being is an ocean.
He partakes of everything in the world,
and still his thoughts go beyond it.
And even if he were to partake of the other world,
his thoughts would also go beyond it.

— Aitereya Aranyaka 2.3.2 – 2.3.3

The Aitareya Aranyaka dates to between 700 and 500 BCE. There are five chapters of this work, each of which is even considered as a full Aranyaka. The first one deals with the regimen known as 'Mahaa-vrata'. The explanations are both ritualistic as well as speculative. The second one has six chapters of which the first three are about 'Praana-vidyaa' – meaning, Prana, the Vital Air that constitutes the life-breath of a living body is also the life-breath of all mantras, all vedas and all vedic declarations (cf. 2.2.2 of Aitareya Aranyaka). It is in this portion of the Aranyaka that one finds specific statements about how one who follows the vedic injunctions and performs the sacrifices goes to become the God of Fire, or the Sun or Air and how one who transgresses the Vedic prescriptions is born into lower levels of being, namely, as birds and reptiles.

The 4th, 5th and 6th chapters of this second Aranyaka constitute what is known as Aitareya Upanishad.

The third Aranyaka in this chain of Aranyakas is also known as 'Samhitopanishad'. This elaborates on the various ways – like pada-paatha, krama-paatha, etc. – of reciting the Vedas and the nuances of the 'svaras'.

The fourth and the fifth Aranyaka are technical and dwell respectively on the mantras known as 'MahaanaamnI' and the yajna known as 'Madhyandina'.

=== Taittiriya Aranyaka ===
There are ten chapters, of which, one to six form the Aranyaka proper. The first two chapters are part of the aṣṭau kāṭhakāni (the "8 Kathaka sections"), which were not native to the tradition of the Taittiriya shakha. They were adopted from the Kāṭhaka shakha, and mostly deal with varieties of the Agnicayana ritual and with Vedic study.

Chapter 1, is a very late Vedic chapter, which even has some Puranic names; it is usually called the Āruṇa praśna for the particular styleof fire-brick piling dealt with in the text. It is also referred to as the "Surya namaskara chapter" by South Indian Brahmins who have created a ritual of reciting it with surya namaskara exercises after each of its 132 anuvakas. Parts of the Kaṭha version of this section has been published by L. v. Schroeder in 1898.

Chapter 2, discusses the five Mahā-yajñas that every Brahmin has to do daily, most importantly the daily recitation of the Veda (svādhyāya). Further, the sacred thread, the yajñopavīta, sandhyā worship, that of the ancestors (pitṛ), the brahma-yajña, and the cleansing homa-sacrifice ('kūṣmāṇḍa-homa') are all treated in detail. – In this chapter the word 'shramana' is used (2-7-1) in the meaning of an ascetic (tapasvin); this word was later used also for the Buddhist and Jain ascetics. – Discussed and translated by Ch. Malamoud (in French, 1977); the Kaṭha version of this section has been published by L. v. Schroeder in 1898.

Chapter 3, treats technicalities of several other homas and yajnas.

Chapter 4, provides the mantras used in the pravargya Shrauta ritual that is considered to be dangerous as it involves heating a specially prepared clay vessel full of milk until it is glowing red. It is fairly close to the Kaṭha version.

Chapter 5, treats the Pravargya-yajña in prose discussion (brāhmaṇa style). Again, it is fairly close to the Kaṭha version.

Chapter 6, records the 'pitṛmedha' mantras, recited during the rituals for the disposal of the dead body.

Chapters 7, 8 and 9, are the three vallis of the well-known Taittiriya Upanishad.

Chapter 10, is also known as the "Mahanarayana Upanishad". It has several important mantras culled from the three Samhitas. TA 10.41–44 is known as the "Medha sukta".

=== Katha Aranyaka ===
The Katha Aranyaka is fairly parallel to the text of the Taittiriyas. It has been preserved, somewhat fragmentarily, in just one Kashmiri birchbark manuscript. It has recently been edited and translated, cf. the early uncritical print by L. von Schroeder

=== Kaushitaki Āranyaka ===
It is also known as Shankhyayana Aranyaka. There are fifteen chapters:

Chapters 1–2 deal with the Mahavrata.

Chapters 3–6 constitute the Kaushitaki Upanishad.

Chapters 7–8 are known as a Samhitopanishad.

Chapter 9 presents the greatness of Prana.

Chapter 10 deals with the esoteric implications of the Agnihotra ritual. All divine personalities are inherent in the Purusha, just as Agni in speech, Vayu in Prana, the Sun in the eyes, the Moon in the mind, the directions in the ears and water in the potency. The one who knows this, says the Aranyaka, and in the strength of that conviction goes about eating, walking, taking and giving, satisfies all the gods and what he offers in the fire reaches those gods in heaven. (cf.10-1).

Chapter 11 prescribes several antidotes in the form of rituals for warding off death and sickness. It also details the effects of dreams.

Chapter 12 elaborates the fruits of prayer.

Chapter 13 treats more philosophical matters and says one must first attitudinally discard one's bodily attachment and then carry on the 'shravana', manana and nidhidhyasana and practise all the disciplines of penance, faith, self-control etc.

Chapter 14 gives just two mantras. One extols the "I am Brahman" mantra and says it is the apex of all Vedic mantras. The second mantra declares that one who does not get the meaning of mantras but only recites vedic chants is like an animal which does not know the value of the weight it carries.

Chapter 15 gives a long genealogy of spiritual teachers from Brahma down to Guna-Sankhayana.

=== Brihad-Aranyaka ===
The Aranyaka of the Shukla Yajurveda is part of its Brahmana: Satapatha Br. 14,1–3 in the Madhyandina version. Like the Taittiriya and Katha Aranyakas it exclusively deals with the Parvargya ritual, and is followed by the Brihad-Aranyaka Upanishad (Satapatha Br. 14.4–9).

== Rahasya Brahmanas ==
There is also a certain continuity of the Aranyakas from the Brahmanas in the sense that the Aranyakas go into the meanings of the 'secret' rituals not detailed in the Brahmanas. Later tradition sees this as a leap into subtlety that provides the reason for Durgacharya in his commentary on the Nirukta to say that the Aranyakas are 'Rahasya Brahmana', that is, the Brahmana of secrets.

== See also ==
- Brihad-Aranyaka Upanishad
