= Sadvimsha Brahmana =

Sadvimsha Brahmana (Ṣaḍviṃṡa Brāhmaṇa) (ṢadvB) is considered as an appendix to the Panchavimsha Brahmana (which has twenty-five Books) and its twenty-sixth prapathaka or Book. The last part of this Brahmana text is the Adbhuta Brahmana, a Vedanga text dealing with magic.

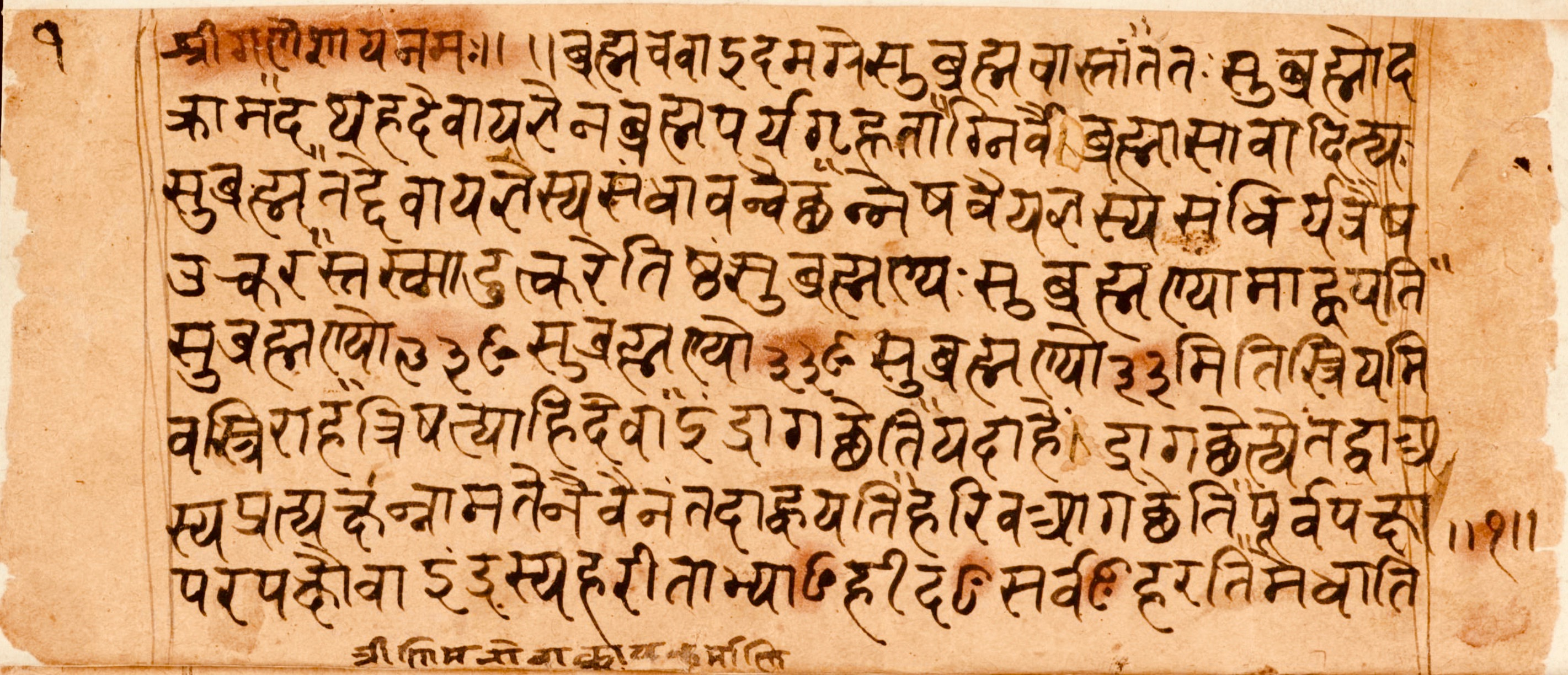
