= Udgitha =

Udgitha may be:

- a division of the Samaveda historically chanted in Vedic ritual by the Udgatr priest
- a name of the mystical syllable Om
- a name of a medieval Hindu scholar, see Udgithacarya
