= Panchavimsha Brahmana =

The Tandya Mahabrahmana (or the Praudha Brahmana) ("great" Brahmana), also known as the Panchavimsha Brahmana from its consisting of twenty-five prapathakas (chapters) is a Brahmana of the Samaveda, belonging to both of its Kauthuma and Ranayaniya shakhas. It deals with the duties of the udgātṛs generally, and especially of the various kinds of chants.

== Contents ==
The work is divided into 25 prapathakas, which are further divided into 347 khandas (sections). An overview of the contents of the text is as follows:

- Prapathaka I: Collection of Yajus
- Prapathaka II-III: Vistutis
- Prapathaka IV–IX.2: Various rites (Jyotishtoma, Ukthya, Atiratra, Prakrtis of ekahas and ahinas)
- Prapathaka IX.3–IX.10: Somaprayaschittas
- Prapathaka X–XV: Dvadashaha rite
- Prapathaka XVI–XIX: One day rites
- Prapathaka XX–XXII: Ahina rites
- Prapathaka XXIII–XXV: Longer rites (known as the Satras)
