= Madhyandina Shakha =

Shakha of Shukla Yajurveda

Madhyandina Shakha is a shakha (branch) of Shukla Yajurveda. This branch includes Madhyandina Samhita, Madhyandina Shatapatha Brahmana, Ishavasya Upanishad and Brihadaranyaka Upanishad. Recitation of this Shakha is prevalent over most of North India, Maharashtra and among Yajurvedi Shrimali Brahmin pandits of Gujarat and Rajasthan.

== Traditions ==
Many north Indian Veda Pandits recite it in a different way compared to those from Maharashtra. Many of the former pronounce the syllable ष (ṣa) as ख (kha).

A large number of Shukla Yajur Vedic Madhyandina Shakha Brahmins are residing in Nashik, Maharashtra and many in Bihar (Maithil Brahmins/Vajasaneyi Brahmins except those belonging to Shandilya Gotra/Chhandog Brahmins), Bengal and Uttar pradesh too. An association has also been formed with 3000 members on its roll. And a large number reside in Nepal. Estimates over two hundred thousand. Many have immigrated to USA, and Germany.

== See also ==
- Kanva Shakha
- Vajasaneya Shakha
- Devavrata Mahesh Rekhe
