= Gopatha Brahmana =

Religious text in Hinduism

The Gopatha Brahmana (Sanskrit: गोपथ ब्राह्मण, Gopatha Brāhmaṇa) is the only Brahmana, a genre of the prose texts describing the Vedic rituals, associated with the Atharvaveda. The text is associated with both the Shaunaka and the Paippalada recensions of the Atharvaveda. This text and the short Brahmanas of the Samaveda are the latest amongst the Vedic texts belonging to this genre. The text is divided into two parts, the purva-bhaga or purva-brahmana comprising five prapathakas and the uttara-bhaga or uttara-brahmana comprising six prapathakas. Each prapathaka is further divided into kandikas. The purva-bhaga comprises 135 kandikas and the uttara-bhaga comprises 123 kandikas.

== Recensions ==
The Atharvaveda once existed in nine recensions, each with an exclusive group of adherents. The nine schools with different titles in brackets are:

- Paippalāda (Paipalā, Paiplāda, Pippālā, Paipalā, Paippalā)
- Śaunaka (Śaunakā, Śaunakī)
- Cāranavidyā
- Brahmavada (Brahmabalā, Brahmapalāśa, Brahmadaā, Brahmadapala, Brahmadāpalaśa, Brahmadāpaśa)
- Stauda [tauda] (Kumudādin, Dānta, Dāmodā, Taitā, Pradānta, Kunatta)
- Devadarśa (Śhaukkāyana, Kunakhivedadarśin, Devadarśī, Vedarśī)
- Mauda (Moda, Pradānta, Auprā, Datā, Dāntā, Dānta, Damoda)
- Jājāla (Jājala, Jābāla, Naki Naki, Taita)
- Vedasparśa (Jalada, Auta, Pradāpalā, Ttota)

Gopatha Brahmana is the only Brahmana representing all schools of the Atharvaveda listed above.

== Differences with other texts ==
Adhikari quotes Sayana (tathā ca gopathabrāhmaṇam/ājyabhāgāntam prāk tantram ūrdhvaṃ sviṣṭakṛta svahā/havīṃṣi yajña āvāpo yathā tanttasya tantavaḥ), to point out that the original Gopatha Brahmana once had more than eleven chapters, all of which are not available to us today. Culture in the Gopatha Brahmana is known to us only from currently available chapters.

The Gopatha Brahmana differs from other vedic texts, such as in its concept of creation of universe, concept of om, view on Gayatri and Brahmacharya, interpretation of sacrifice, priests, liturgical formalities; and classification of sacrifices, as well as grammatical and linguistic peculiarities. Generally, vedic sacrifices are five-fold, i.e., agnihotra, darśapūrṇamāsa, cāturmāsya, paśu and soma. However, the Gopatha Brahmana I.5.23 gives a totally different classification, wherein it states there are three classes and each class consists of seven sacrifices, to make a total of twenty-one sacrifices; to include seven somayajnas, seven pakayajnas and seven haviryajnas.

The Gopatha Brahmana is the only source which provides an account on the origin of the Atharvaveda.

== Dating and classification ==
Bloomsfield thought that the Gopatha Brahmana (GB) belongs to the Saunaka schools and was composed after the Vaitāna Sutra (VS), and opined the passages 2.1.16, 2.1.9 and 2.2.12 are merely brahmanized forms of Vaitāna Sutra passages 11.1, 15.3 and 16.15-17 respectively. He argued on the later dating based on the point that GB is not consistent in quoting mantras from older texts while the VS records them in full. He thus opined that the VS is the samhita text of GB. His persuasive argument was also based on the language used, of which the most important one is based on two kinds of plants, viz., atharvanic (holy) and angirasic (terrible) from VS 5.10, which GB 1.2.18 borrows in the same language. Additionally, he cited many passages from VS corresponding to GB, some of which are 11.17, 12.1, 12.14 and 8.8 of VS corresponding to 1.3.19, 1.3.22, 1.3.23 and 2.1.19 of GB; and thus concluded that GB was composed after the VS. While Macdonell supported this view, Caland was very critical of them. Caland's views received support from Keith, Durga Mohan Bhattacharya, and Hukum Chand Patyal.

In Caland's view, the Gopatha Brahmana belongs to the Paippalada and predates the Vaitana Sutra. Caland's argument was based on the point that verses from the GB are found only in the Paippalada version and not the Saunaka recension, a view supported by Gaastra and Bhattacharya. The Paippalada view was also supported by K. D.Tiwari based on the verse, śaṃ no devīr, which GB quotes as the initial verse of the Atharvaveda while redacting initial verses of each samhita text. As per Caland, the VS can be better understood using corresponding passages of the GB. He argued that in the VS optative verb forms are used, which are against sutra tradition; but this indicates their indebtedness from former passages. For example, Caland pointed out VS 18.1 omits two words (subramaṇya subrahmaṇyam-āhvayati) which he thinks are indebted from GB 2.2.16 where the missing words are to be accounted for; also taking its original source T.S.VI.3.1.1. into notice. Caland relied upon internal evidence such as this to put forth his argument that the GB predates VS and thus belongs to the same period when brahmanas were composed.

Based on the above, and other internal and comparative evidence, Taraknath Adhikari proposed that the Gopatha Brahmana is not a text of very late date and can be assigned to the period just before the upanishadic period, namely in the late brahmana period, as there is no trace of this text in the early brahmana period, while the atharvaveda itself receiving distinct recognition in the later upanishadic period. But, according to Adhikari, the final redaction in the Atharvaveda probably happened in the later-mantra period.

== Editions ==
The first printed edition of the Gopatha Brahmana was edited by Rajendralal Mitra and Harachandra Vidyabhushan. It was published by the Asiatic Society, Calcutta as a part of their Bibliotheca Indica series (Nos. 215 and 252) in 1872. This edition was full of printing errors, denounced as a "marvel of editorial ineptitude" by Bloomfield. The next printed edition was edited by Jivananda Vidyasagar. It was published from Calcutta in 1891. This edition was almost same as the earlier edition by the Asiatic Society. Dutch scholar Dieuke Gaastra brought a critical edition with an exhaustive introduction in German from Leiden in 1919. This edition was based on six manuscripts. Pandit Kshemkarandas Trivedi published an edition with Hindi translation and Sanskrit commentary from Allahabad in 1924. The second edition of it was published from Allahabad in 1977. This edition was also based on the Asiatic Society and Vidyasagar editions. In 1980, Vijayapal Vidyavaridhi brought out an edition of this text. His edition, published by Ramlal Kapur Trust from Bahalgarh, Haryana. This edition was based on Gaastra's edition.

=== Khanda section ===
Gopatha Brahmana is divided into two sections,

- purva-bhaga (a.k.a. purva-gopatha or purvardha), with 5 prapathakas (chapters) having 135 kandikas (paragraphs).
- uttara-bhaga (a.k.a. uttara-gopatha, or uttarardha) with 6 prapathakas having 123 kandikas.

Khanda	Prapathaka	Kandikas	Khanda	Prapathaka	Kandikas
I (purva-bhaga)	1	39	II (uttara-bhaga)	1	26
	2	24		2	24
	3	23		3	28
	4	24		4	19
	5	25		5	15
				6	16
	Total Khandas	135 +		Total Khandas	123 = 258
