= Kanva Shakha =

Kāṇva Shākha (Sanskrit:काण्व शाखा) is the oldest shakha ("branch" or "recension") of Shukla Yajurveda. The Kānva tradition is followed mostly in Tamil Nadu, Orissa, Karnataka, parts of Maharashtra, Madhya Pradesh, Gujarat and Andhra Pradesh. The Kānva Shākha was quite prevalent around the period of Shankaracharya's birth. The parampara āchārya (main founding guru) for Shukla Yajurveda was sage Yajnavalkya.

The main Samhita for Kānva Shākha is the Kanva Samhita and the corresponding brahmana is Kanva Shatapatha Brahmana. The main upanishads of the Kānva Shākha are Ishavasya Upanishad and Brihadaranyaka Upanishad. The Shrauta Sutra for Kānva Shākha is Katyayana Shrauta Sutra and the Grhya Sutra is Paraskara Grhya Sutram.

The major āchāryas who belonged to the Kānva Shākha included:

- Sureshvaracharya (aka. Mandana Mishra), who was the disciple of Shankaracharya.
- Akkalkot Swami Samarth revered as Dattatreya avatara also belonged to the Kānva Shākha.

== Traditions ==
The style of recitation or chanting of the Kānva Shākha is quite distinct compared to the Madhyandina Shakha of the Shukla Yajurveda and the Kānva Samhita includes 211 additional verses that are not present in the Madhyandina Shakha.

== See also ==
- Madhyandina Shakha
- Yajurveda
