= Kauthuma Samhita =

Hindu text

Kauthuma Samhita (Sanskrit: कौथुम संहिता) is a Samhita branch of the text Samaveda in Hinduism. It belongs to the Kauthuma Shakha. The Samhita of Kauthuma consists of traditional recitation of Samaveda. It consists two of parts. The first part is comprised by original verses which are majorly taken from the text Rigveda. Similarly the second part consists of Gaanas which are based on the original verses. The Kauthuma branch of Samaveda is majorly followed in the northern part of the Indian subcontinent. In the Mithila region of the subcontinent, it is followed by the Chandogic Brahmins of the Maithil Brahmins community.

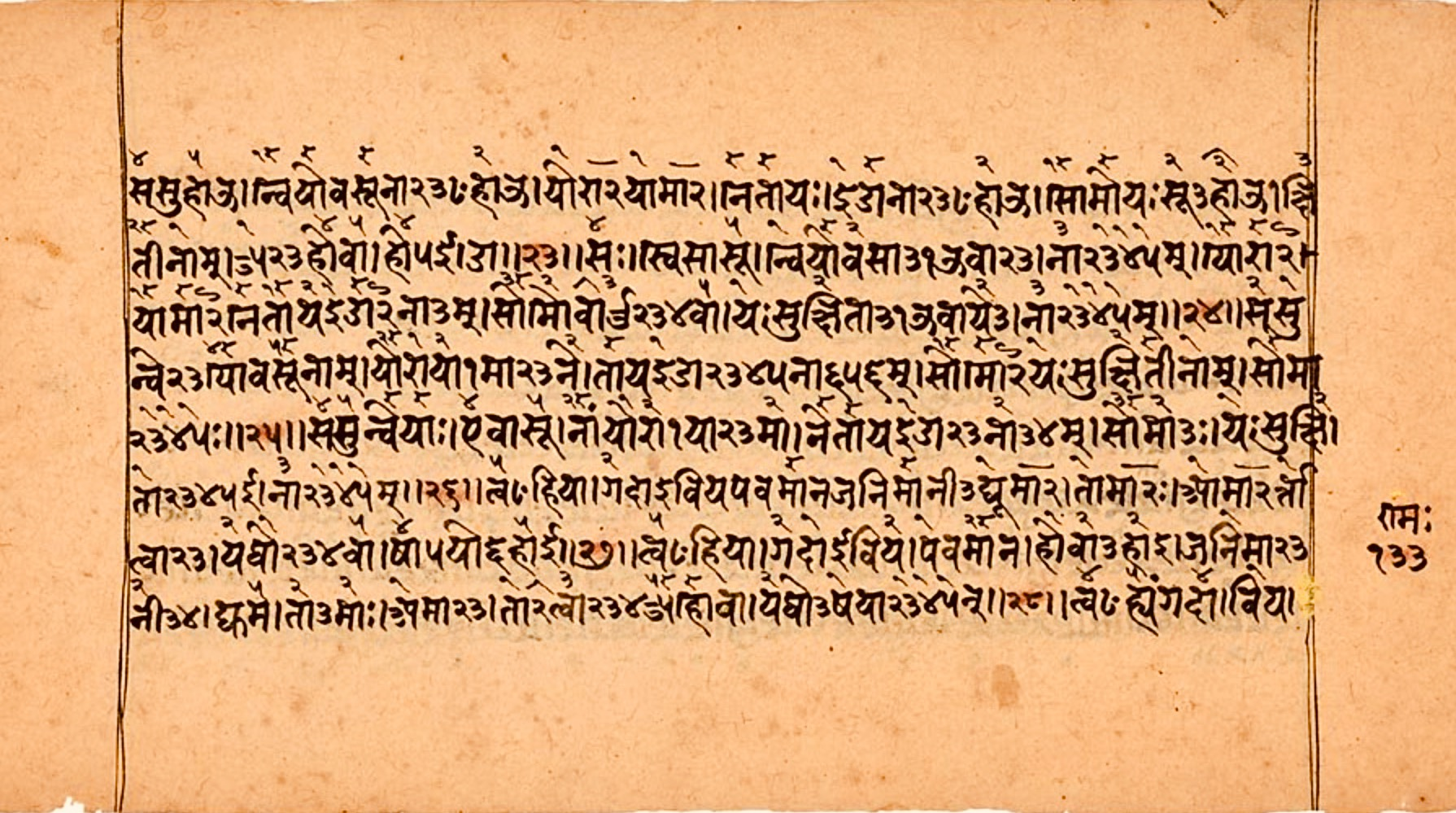
Copy of the 1672 CE manuscript on paper of the 10th century BCE Samaveda's Kauthuma Samhita Veyagana kept at Schoyen Collection near Oslo in Norway. (MS 5293) - Photographed by Ms Sarah Welch

== Etymology ==
This branch of Samaveda is named after the Vedic sage Kauthuma. He was the son of the sage Parashara. He was the acharya of Samaveda and his school was known as Kauthuma Shakha. The Samhita founded by him was called Kauthuma Samhita.

== Literary structure ==
The literature of the Kauthuma Samhita is broadly divided into two parts. The first part of the Samhita is known as Archika and the second part is known as Gana.

Archika is further divided into two parts. They are Purvarcika and Uttararcika. Again Purvarcika is divided into four parts. They are Agneya, Aindra, Pavamana and Aranya. The Archika part contains mantras. The total number of mantras in the Archika part is 1875. The Purvarcika part contains 650 mantras and the Uttararcika part contains 1225 mantras. Among the total number of mantras, 1771 mantras are taken from the Samhita of Rigveda and the rest 99 mantras are of the Samaveda itself. The number of mantras in the sub-parts Agneya, Aindra, Pavamana and Aranya are respectively 114, 352, 119 and 65. The mantras in the sub-part Agneya is dedicated to Lord Agni and that of Aindra is dedicated to Lord Indra. Similarly, the mantras in the Pavamana sub-part is dedicated to Lord Soma and Pavamana. In the Aranya sub-part, 55 mantras are of Agni, Indra, Soma, etc and the rest 10 mantras are Mahanamni mantras.

The other major part Gana of the Samhita is also divided into two parts. They are Prakriti Gana and Uha Gana.
