= Shatapatha Brahmana =

Ancient commentary on the Śukla (white) Yajurveda

The Shatapatha Brahmana (Sanskrit: शतपथब्राह्मण, lit. 'Brāhmaṇa of one hundred paths', IAST: Śatapatha Brāhmaṇa, abbreviated to 'SB') is a part of the Śukla Yajurveda. It is attributed to the Vedic sage Yajnavalkya. Described as the most complete, systematic, and important of the Brahmanas (commentaries on the Vedas), it contains detailed explanations of Vedic sacrificial rituals, symbolism, and mythology.

Particularly in its description of sacrificial rituals (including construction of complex fire-altars).

The Shatapatha Brahmana is also considered significant in the development of Vaishnavism as the origin of several Puranic legends and avatars of Vishnu. Notably, all of them (Matsya, Kurma, Varaha, Narasimha, and Vamana) are listed as the first five avatars in the Dashavatara (the ten principal avatars of Vishnu).

There are two versions (recensions) available of this text. They are the Madhyandina recension and the Kanva recension. This article focuses exclusively on the Madhyandina version of the Shatapatha Brahmana.

== Nomenclature ==
The 'Shatapatha Brahmana' (Sanskrit शतपथब्राह्मण) can be loosely translated as 'Brahmana of one hundred paths':

- 'Brahmana' (Sanskrit ब्राह्मण) means 'explanations of sacred knowledge or doctrine'.
- 'Shatapatha' (Sanskrit शतपथ) means 'having a hundred paths' or 'proceeding in a hundred ways'.

=== Kanda and Adhyâya ===
- 'Kanda' (or 'Khanda', Sanskrit खंड), means 'chapter', 'division of a book', or more loosely 'book'. It also means 'praise' and 'water'.
- 'Adhyâya' (Sanskrit अध्याय), means 'chapter' (of a book), 'lesson', 'reading' and 'lecture'.

In relation to the Shatapatha Brahmana, a reference such as '14.1.2' means 'Kanda 14, Adhyaya 1, Brahmana 2', or in English, 'Book 14, Chapter 1, Explanation 2'. The addition of a fourth digit at the end (e.g. 17.7.3.11) refers to the verse number.

== Date ==
Arthur Berriedale Keith states that linguistically, the Shatapatha Brahmana belongs to the later part of the Brāhmaṇa period of Vedic Sanskrit (8th-6th century BCE). Asko Parpola dates it to around 700 BCE. J. Eggeling (translator of the Vājasaneyi mādhyandina recension into English), dates the final written version of the text to 300 BCE, although he states that some elements are 'far older, transmitted orally from unknown antiquity'.

There are claims of dating the text much further back than the said ranges, and scholars have extensively rejected such claims; Witzel criticizes it for "faulty reasoning" and taking "a rather dubious datum and us[ing] it to reinterpret Vedic linguistic, textual, ritual history while neglect[ing] all the other contradictory data." According to Witzel, the Shatapatha Brahmana does not contain precise contemporary astronomical records, but rather only approximate naked-eye observations for ritual concerns which likely reflect oral remembrances of older time periods; furthermore, the same general observations are recorded in the Babylonian MUL.APIN tablets of c. 1000 BCE. The Shatapatha Brahmana contains clear references to the use of iron, so it cannot be dated earlier than c. 1200–1000 BCE, while it reflects cultural, philosophical, and socio-political developments that are later than other Iron Age texts (such as the Atharvaveda) and only slightly earlier than the time of the Buddha (c. 5th century BCE)

tarhi videgho māthava āsa | sarasvatyāṃ sa tata eva prāṅdahannabhīyāyemām pṛthivīṃ taṃ gotamaśca rāhūgaṇo videghaśca māthavaḥ paścāddahantamanvīyatuḥ sa imāḥ sarvā nadīratidadāha sadānīretyuttarādgirernirghāvati tāṃ haiva nātidadāha tāṃ ha sma tām purā brāhmaṇā na tarantyanatidagdhāgninā vaiśvānareṇeti

— Śatapatha Brahmnana, transliteration of Kanda I, Adhyâya IV, Brâhmana I, Verse 14
Translation:

Mâthava, the Videgha, was at that time on the (river) Sarasvatî. He (Agni) thence went burning along this earth towards the east; and Gotama Râhûgana and the Videgha Mathava followed after him as he was burning along. He burnt over (dried up) all these rivers. Now that (river), which is called 'Sadânîrâ,' flows from the northern (Himâlaya) mountain: that one he did not burn over. That one the Brâhmans did not cross in former times, thinking, 'it has not been burnt over by Agni Vaisvânara.'

— Śatapatha Brahmana, translation by Julius Eggeling (1900), Kanda I, Adhyâya IV, Brâhmana I, Verse 14

== Content and recensions ==
According to the Indira Gandhi National Centre for the Arts (IGNCA), the Shatapatha Brahmana survives in two recensions:

Divisions	Madhyandina Recension	Kanva Recension
Kāṇḍas	14	17
Adhyāyas	100	104
Prapathakas	68	-
Brahmanas	436	435
Kandikas	7179	6806
The Madhyandina recension is known as the Vājasaneyi mādhyandina śākhā, and is ascribed to Yājñavalkya Vājasaneya. The Kanva recension is known as the Kāṇva śākhā, and is ascribed to Samkara

The 14 books of the Madhyandina recension can be divided into two major parts. The first 9 books have close textual commentaries, often line by line, of the first 18 books of the corresponding samhita of the Śukla (white) Yajurveda. The remaining 5 books of the Shatapatha cover supplementary and ritualistically newer material; the content of the 14th and last book constitutes the Bṛhad-Āraṇyaka Upaniṣad. The IGNCA also provides further structural comparison between the recensions, noting that the 'names of the Kandas also vary between the two (versions) and the sequence in which they appear':

Kanda	Madhyandina No.	Kanva No.
Ekapat	2	1
Haviryajna	1	2
Udhari	–	3
Adhvara	3	4
Graha	4	5
Vajapeya	–	6
Sava	5	–
Rajasuya	–	7
Ukhasambharana	6	8
Hastighata	7	9
Citi	8	10
Sagniciti (Saciti)	–	11
Sanciti	9	–
Agnirahasya	10	12
Astadhyayi	11	13
Madhyama	12	14
Asvamedha	13	15
Pravarghya	–	16
Brhadaranyaka	14	17

The IGNCA adds that 'the division of Kandika is more rational in the Kanva text than in the other... The name 'Shatapatha', as Eggeling has suggested, might have been based on the number of Adhyayas in the Madhyandina which is exactly one hundred. But the Kanva recension, which has one hundred and four Adhyayas is also known by the same name. In Indian tradition words like 'sata' and 'sahasra', indicating numbers, do not always stand for exact numbers'.

=== Brihadaranayaka Upanishad ===
The Brihadaranyaka Upanishad forms the concluding part of the last Kanda, known as 'Aranyaka' of both recensions of the Shatapatha Brahmana. Swami Madhavananda states that this Upanishad is 'the greatest of the Upanishads... not only in extent; but it is also the greatest in respect of its substance and theme. It is the greatest Upanishad in the sense that the illimitable, all-embracing, absolute, self-luminous, blissful reality – the Brhat or Brahman, identical with Atman, constitutes its theme'.

== Significance in early Indian knowledge ==
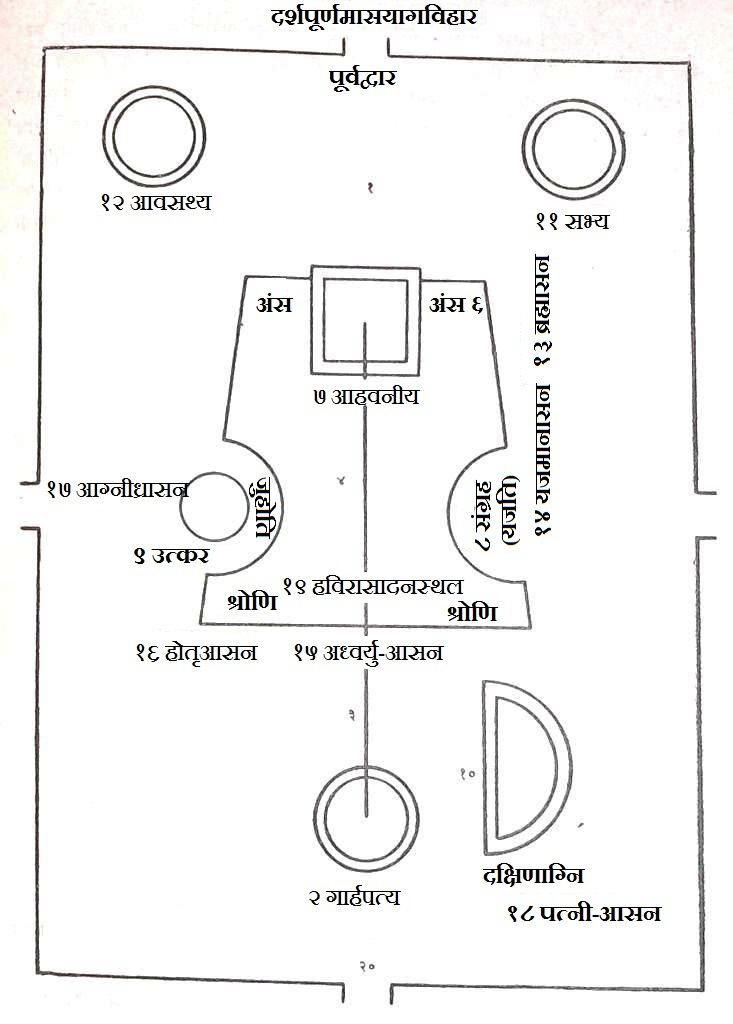
Shape of fire altar during full moon-new moon sacrifice.

=== Astronomy ===
In relation to sacrifice and astronomical phenomena detailed in texts such as the Shatapatha Brahmana (e.g. sacrifices performed during the waxing and waning of the moon), N. Aiyangar states the fact that 'the Vedic people had a celestial [i.e. astronomical] counterpart of their sacrificial ground is clear', and cites an example of the YajnaVaraha sacrifice in relation to the constellation of Orion. Roy elaborates further on this example, stating that when 'the sun became united with Orion at the vernal equinox...[this] commenced the yearly [YajnaVaraha] sacrifice'. The vernal (March) equinox marks the onset of spring, and is celebrated in Indian culture as the Holi festival (the spring festival of colours).

A.A. Macdonell adds that the Shatapatha in particular is notable as – unlike the Samhitas – in it the Earth was expressly called circular (parimandala), compared to a wheel. This aligns with the traditions of a flat, disc-shaped Earth surrounded by an ocean that later became predominant.

=== Mathematics ===
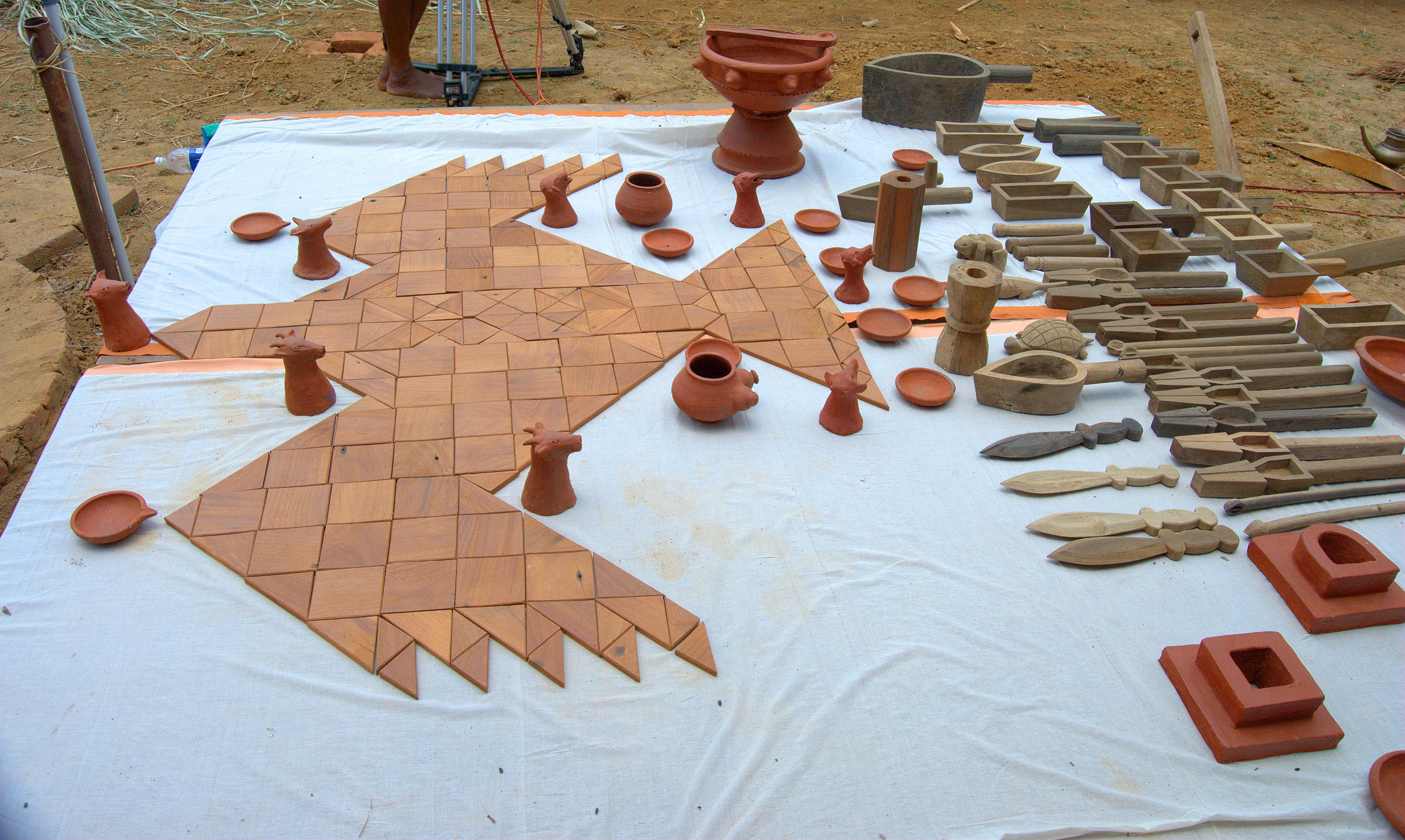
A miniature replica of the Falcon altar (with yajna utensils) used during Athirathram

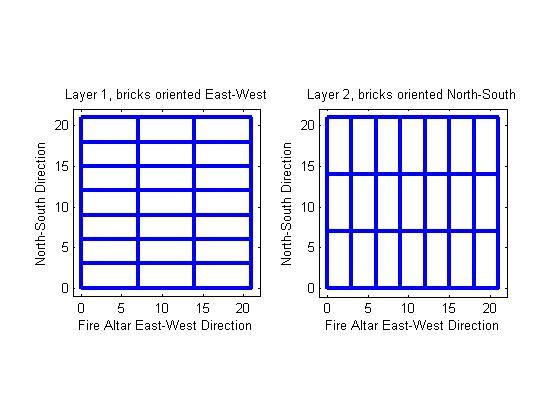
Layout of a basic domestic fire altar.

P. N. Sinha states that the number 1,000 represents 'the thousand Maha yugas of every Kalpa' (about 4.32 billion years), illustrated by the 1,000 hoods of the Naga Vasuki/Ananta on which the Earth is supported. According to F. Staal, layering, size, and configuration of bricks to construct sacrificial altars – real and symbolic – as detailed in texts such as the Shatapatha Brahmana had numerous rules, with Staal adding - in relation to similarities with ancient Greek, Babylonian, and Chinese geometry:

Vedic geometry is attached to ritual because it is concerned with the measurement and construction of ritual enclosures [and] of altars... Vedic geometry developed from the construction of these and other complex altar shapes. All are given numerous interpretations in the Brahmanas and Aranyakas [texts relating to the Vedas]... [but the] Sulba Sutras contain the earliest extant verbal expression of the closely related theorem that is still often referred to as the Theorem of Pythagoras but that was independently discovered by the Vedic Indians...

— Discovering the Vedas: Origins, Mantras, Rituals, Insights by Frits Staal, 2008 (pp. 265–267)

== Significance in Vaishnavism ==
A.A. Macdonell, A.B. Keith, J. Roy, J. Dowson, W.J. Wilkins, S. Ghose, M.L. Varadpande, N Aiyangar, and D.A. Soifer all state that several avatars and associated Puranic legends of Vishnu either originate (e.g. Matsya, Kurma, Varaha, and Narasimha) or at least were significantly developed (e.g. Vamana) in the Shatapatha Brahmana (SB). Notably, all constitute the first five avatars listed in the Dashavatara, the ten principal avatars of Vishnu.

=== Vishnu ===
Sofia states ''developments that occur in the general character of Visnu in the Brahmana literature have far-reaching influence on the growth and moulding of avataric Visnu... Probably the single most important development, which is first found in the Brahmanas and exerts the most influence over all other factors, is the identification of Vishnu with the sacrifice'. Vishnu is explicitly stated to be sacrifice repeatedly throughout the Shatapatha Brahmana (e.g. SB 1.7.4.20, 1.1.4.9, 3.2.1.38, 3.6.3.3, 5.2.3.6, 5.4.5.1, 5.4.5.18, 11.4.1.4, 12.5.4.11, 14.1.1.13, and 11.4.1.4).

==== Kanda 14, Adhyaya 1, Brahmana 1 ====
in SB 14.1.1 ('The Pravargya'), the story given is that 'the gods Agni, Indra, Soma, Makha, Vishnu, and the [Visvedevas], except the two Asvins, performed a sacrificial session', which was first attained by Vishnu, hence 'he became the most excellent of the gods'. Upadika ants then agreed with the other gods to gnaw at the bowstring of Vishnu while He rested his head on the Bow, in exchange for the boon to 'find water even in the desert' (as 'all food is water'). The Gharma (hot beverage offered as an oblation) is named after the sound of Vishnu's head hitting the ground (which 'on falling became yonder sun'), and 'inasmuch as he [Vishnu] stretched out (pra-vrig) on the ground, therefrom the Pravargya (took its name)'. The body of Vishnu is encompassed by Indra, who possessed by His glory 'became Makhavat (possessed of makha)'. Vishnu is then divided into three parts, with Agni receiving the first (morning) portion, Indra the second (midday) portion, and the remaining Visvedevas the third portion.

=== Kurma ===
Kurma, the tortoise avatar of Vishnu, is inextricably linked in the Puranas with the legend of the churning of the Ocean of Milk, referred to as the Samudra manthan. The tortoise avatar is also synonymous with Akupara, the 'world-turtle' supporting the Earth, as well as the Saptarishi sage, Kasyapa. Accounts from the Shatapatha Brahmana are stated by Varadpande to be the seed of Kurma.

Eggeling adds that the 'kapalas [cups used in ritual sacrifices] are usually arranged in such a manner as to produce a fancied resemblance to the (upper) shell of the tortoise, which is a symbol of the sky, as the tortoise itself represents the universe... In the same way the term kapala, in the singular, is occasionally applied to the skull, as well as to the upper and the lower case of the tortoise, e.g. Sat Br. VII, 5, 1, 2 [7.5.1.2].'

==== Kanda 1, Adhyaya 6, Brahmana 2 ====
tercantaḥ śrāmyantaśceruḥ | śrameṇa ha sma vai taddevā jayanti yadeṣāṃvjayyamāsarṣayaśca tebhyo devā vaiva prarocayāṃ cakruḥ svayaṃ vaiva dadhrire pretavtadeṣyāmo yato devāḥ svargaṃ lokaṃ samāśnuvateti te kim prarocate kim prarocata iti ceruretpuroḍāśameva kūrmam bhūtvā sarpantaṃ teha sarva eva menire yaṃ vai yajña iti

te hocuḥ | aśvibhyāṃ tiṣṭha sarasvatyai tiṣṭhendrāya tiṣṭheti sa sasarpaivāgnaye tiṣṭheti tatastasthāvagnaye vāasthāditi tamagnāveva parigṛhya sarvahutamajuhavurāhutirhidevānāṃ tata ebhyo yajñaḥ prārocata tamasṛjanta tamatanvata so 'yam paro 'varaṃ yajño 'nūcyate pitaiva putrāya brahmacāriṇe

— Satapatha Brahmnana, transliteration of Kanda I, Adhyâya VI, Brâhmana II, Verses 3–4
Translation:

They went on praising and toiling; for by (religious) toil, the gods indeed gained what they wished to gain, and (so did) the Rishis. Now whether it be that the gods caused it (the sacrifice) to attract (or, peep forth to) them, or whether they took to it of their own accord, they said, 'Come, let us go to the place whence the gods obtained possession of the world of heaven!' They went about saying (to one another), 'What attracts? What attracts?' and came upon the sacrificial cake which had become a tortoise and was creeping about. Then they all thought, 'This surely must be the sacrifice!'

They said, 'Stand still for the Asvins! stand still for Sarasvati! stand still for Indra!' still it crept on;--'Stand still for Agni!' at this it stopped. Having then enveloped it in fire (Agni), knowing, as they did, that it had stopped for Agni, they offered it up entirely, for it was an oblation to the gods. Then the sacrifice pleased them; they produced it, they spread it. And this same sacrifice is taught by the former to the later; the father (teaches it) to his son when he is a student (brahmakârin).

— Satapatha Brahmana, translation by Julius Eggeling (1900), Kanda I, Adhyâya VI, Brâhmana II, Verses 3–4

Macdonell also notes another instance in the Taittiriya Samhita (2.6.3; relating to the Krishna (Black) YajurVeda), where Prajapati assigns sacrifices for the gods and places the oblation within himself, before Risis arrive at the sacrifice and 'the sacrificial cake (purodasa) is said to become a tortoise'.

==== Kanda 6, Adhyaya 1, Brahmana 1 ====
so 'yam puruṣaḥ prajāpatirakāmayata bhūyāntsyām prajāyeyeti so 'śrāmyatsa tapo 'tapyata sa śrāntastepāno brahmaiva prathamamasṛjata trayomeva vidyāṃ saivāsmai pratiṣṭhābhavattasmādāhurbrahmāsya sarvasya pratiṣṭheti tasmādanūcya pratitiṣṭhati pratiṣṭhā hyeṣā yadbrahma tasyām pratiṣṭhāyām pratiṣṭhito 'tapyata

so 'po 'sṛjata | vāca eva lokādvāgevāsya sāsṛjyata sedaṃ sarvamāpnodyadidaṃ kiṃ ca yadāpnottasmādāpo yadavṛṇottasmādvāḥ

so 'kāmayata | ābhyo 'dbhyo 'dhi prajāyeyeti so 'nayā trayyā vidyayā sahāpaḥ prāviśattata āṇḍaṃ samavartata tadabhyamṛśadastvityastu bhūyo 'stvityeva tadabravīttato brahmaiva prathamamasṛjyata trayyeva vidyā tasmādāhurbrahmāsya sarvasya prathamajamityapi hi tasmātpuruṣādbrahmaiva pūrvamasṛjyata tadasya tanmukhamevāsṛjyata tasmādanūcānamāhuragnikalpa iti mukhaṃ hyetadagneryadbrahma...

so 'kāmayata | ābhyo 'dyo 'dhīmām prajanayeyamiti tāṃ saṃkśyāpsu prāvidhyattasyai yaḥ parāṅ raso 'tyakṣaratsa kūrmo 'bhavadatha yadūrdhvamudaukṣyatedaṃ tadyadidamūrdhvamadbhyo 'dhi jāyate seyaṃ sarvāpa evānuvyaittadidamekameva rūpaṃ samadṛśyatāpa eva

— Satapatha Brahmnana, transliteration of Kanda VI, Adhyâya I, Brâhmana I, Verses 8–10 and 12
Translation:

Now this Person Pragâpati desired, 'May I be more (than one), may I be reproduced!' He toiled, he practised austerity. Being worn out with toil and austerity, he created first of all the Brahman (neut.), the triple science. It became to him a foundation: hence they say, 'the Brahman (Veda) is the foundation of everything here.' Wherefore, having studied (the Veda) one rests on a foundation; for this, to wit, the Veda, is his foundation. Resting on that foundation, he (again) practised austerity.

He created the waters out of Vâk (speech, that is) the world; for speech belonged to it: that was created (set free). It pervaded everything here; and because it pervaded (âp) whatsoever there was here, therefore (it is called) water (âpah); and because it covered (var), therefore also it (is called) water (vâr).

He desired, 'May I be reproduced from these waters!' He entered the waters with that triple science. Thence an egg arose. He touched it. 'Let it exist! let it exist and multiply!' so he said. From it the Brahman (neut.) was first created, the triple science. Hence they say, 'The Brahman (n.) is the first-born of this All.' For even before that Person the Brahman was created: it was created as his mouth. Hence they say of him who has studied the Veda, that 'he is like Agni;' for it, the Brahman (Veda), is Agni's mouth...

He desired, 'May I generate, this (earth) from these waters!' He compressed it and threw it into the water. The juice which flowed from it became a tortoise; and that which was spirted upwards (became) what is produced above here over the wafers. This whole (earth) dissolved itself all over the water: all this (universe) appeared as one form only, namely, water.

— Satapatha Brahmana, translation by Julius Eggeling (1900), Kanda VI, Adhyâya I, Brâhmana I, Verses 8–10 and 12

Vak (speech) is female (e.g. SB 1.2.5.15, 1.3.3.8, 3.2.1.19, 3.2.1.22). Used in ritual sacrifices, so is the sacrificial altar (Vedi; SB 3.5.1.33, 3.5.1.35), the spade (abhri; SB 3.5.4.4, 3.6.1.4, 3.7.1.1, 6.3.1.39; see section on Varaha, below), and the firepan (ukha; SB 6.6.2.5). The (generative) principle of gender (i.e. male and female coupling to produce something) is pervasive throughout (as reflected by the Sanskrit language itself).

==== Kanda 7, Adhyaya 5, Brahmana 1 ====
kūrmamupadadhāti | raso vai kūrmo rasamevaitadupadadhāti yo vai sa eṣāṃ lokānāmapsu praviddhānām parāṅraso 'tyakṣaratsa eṣa kūrmastamevaitadupadadhāti yāvānu vai rasastāvānātmā sa eṣa ima eva lokāḥ

tasya yadadharaṃ kapālam | ayaṃ sa lokastatpratiṣṭhitamiva bhavati pratiṣṭhita iva hyayaṃ loko 'tha yaduttaraṃ sā dyaustadbyavagṛhītāntamiva bhavati vyavagṛhītānteva hi dyauratha yadantarā tadantarikṣaṃ sa eṣa ima eva lokā imānevaitallokānupadadhāti...

sa yaḥ kūrmo 'sau sa ādityo | 'mumevaitadādityamupadadhāti taṃ purastātpratyañcamupadadhātyamuṃ tadādityam purastātpratyañcaṃ dadhāti tasmādasāvādityaḥ purastātpratyaṅ dhīyate dakṣiṇato 'ṣāḍhāyai vṛṣā vai kūrmo yoṣāṣāḍhā dakṣiṇato vai vṛṣā yoṣāmupaśete 'ratnimātre 'ratnimātrāddhi vṛṣā yoṣāmupaśete saiṣā sarvāsāmiṣṭakānām mahiṣī yadaṣāḍhaitasyai dakṣiṇataḥ santsarvāsāmiṣṭakānāṃ dakṣiṇato bhavati

— Satapatha Brahmnana, transliteration of Kanda VII, Adhyâya V, Brâhmana I, Verses 1–2 and 6
Translation:

He then puts down a (living) tortoise;--the tortoise means life-sap: it is life-sap (blood) he thus bestows on (Agni). This tortoise is that life-sap of these worlds which flowed away from them when plunged into the waters: that (life-sap) he now bestows on (Agni). As far as the life-sap extends, so far the body extends: that (tortoise) thus is these worlds.

That lower shell of it is this (terrestrial) world; it is, as it were, fixed; for fixed, as it were, is this (earth-)world. And that upper shell of it is yonder sky; it has its ends, as it were, bent down; for yonder sky has its ends, as it were, bent down. And what is between (the shells) is the air;--that (tortoise) thus is these worlds: it is these worlds he thus lays down (to form part of the altar)...

And as to its being called 'kûrma' (tortoise); Prajapati, having assumed that form, created living beings. Now what he created, he made; and inasmuch as he made (kar), he is (called) 'kûrma;' and 'kûrma' being (the same as) 'kasyapa' (a tortoise), therefore all creatures are said to be descended from Kasyapa. Now this tortoise is the same as yonder sun: it is yonder sun he thus lays down (on the altar)... On the right (south) of the Ashâdhâ [Altar Brick] (he places it), for the tortoise (kûrma, masc.) is a male, and the Ashâdhâ a female...

— Satapatha Brahmana, translation by Julius Eggeling (1900), Kanda VII, Adhyâya V, Brâhmana I, Verses 1–2 and 6

Originally a form of Prajapati, the creator-god, the tortoise is thus clearly and directly linked with Vedic ritual sacrifice, the sun, and with Kasyapa as a creator (or progenitor). The tortoise is also stated to represent the three worlds (i.e. the triloka). SB 5.1.3.9–10 states 'Pragapati (the lord of generation) represents productiveness... the male means productiveness'. SB 14.1.1, which relates the story of Vishnu becoming the greatest of the gods at a sacrifice of the gods before being decapitated by His bow, states the head of Vishnu became the sun when it fell.

=== Matsya ===
Matsya, the fish avatar of Vishnu, appears to Manu to warn him of an impending deluge. After being reared by and growing to an enormous size, Matsya then guides Manu's ship to safety at the peak of a mountain, where Manu re-establishes life through the performance of Vedic sacrificial rites (yajna). In Puranic accounts, Matsya also rescues the Vedas taken under the water, after they were stolen from Brahma by the Asura called Hayagriva (not to be confused with Hayagriva, the horse-headed avatar of Vishnu). From the Shatapatha Brahmana:

manave ha vai prātaḥ | avanegyamudakamājahruryathedam pāṇibhyāmavanejanāyāharantyevaṃ tasyāvanenijānasya matsyaḥ pāṇī āpede

sa hāsmai vācamuvāda | bibhṛhi mā pārayiṣyāmi tveti kasmānmā pārayiṣyasītyaugha imāḥ sarvāḥ prajā nirvoḍhā tatastvā pārayitāsmīti kathaṃ te bhṛtiriti

sa hovāca | yāvadvai kṣullakā bhavāmo bahvī vai nastāvannāṣṭrā bhavatyuta matsya eva matsyaṃ gilati kumbhyām māgre bibharāsi sa yadā tāmativardhā atha karṣūṃ khātvā tasyām mā bibharāsi sa yadā tāmativardhā atha mā samudramabhyavaharāsi tarhi vā atināṣṭro bhavitāsmīti

śaśvaddha kaṣa āsa | sa hi jyeṣṭhaṃ vardhate 'thetithīṃ samāṃ tadaugha āgantā tanmā nāvamupakalpyopāsāsai sa augha utthite nāvamāpadyāsai tatastvā pārayitāsmīti

— Satapatha Brahmnana, transliteration of Kanda I, Adhyaya VIII, Brahmana I ('The Ida'), Verses 1–4
Translation:

In the morning they brought to Manu water for washing, just as now also they (are wont to) bring (water) for washing the hands. When he was washing himself, a fish came into his hands.

It spake to him the word, 'Rear me, I will save thee!' 'Wherefrom wilt thou save me?' 'A flood will carry away all these creatures: from that I will save thee!' 'How am I to rear thee?'

It said, 'As long as we are small, there is great destruction for us: fish devours fish. Thou wilt first keep me in a jar. When I outgrow that, thou wilt dig a pit and keep me in it. When I outgrow that, thou wilt take me down to the sea, for then I shall be beyond destruction.'

It soon became a ghasha (a large fish); for that grows largest (of all fish). Thereupon it said, 'In such and such a year that flood will come. Thou shalt then attend to me (i.e. to my advice) by preparing a ship; and when the flood has risen thou shalt enter into the ship, and I will save thee from it.'

— Satapatha Brahmana, translation by Julius Eggeling (1900), Kanda I, Adhyaya VIII, Brahmana I ('The Ida'), Verses 1–4

Aiyangar explains that, in relation to the RigVeda, 'Sacrifice is metaphorically called [a] Ship and as Manu means man, the thinker, [so] the story seems to be a parable of the Ship of Sacrifice being the means for man's crossing the seas of his duritas, [meaning his] sins, and troubles'. SB 13.4.3.12 also mentions King Matsya Sammada, whose 'people are the water-dwellers... both fish and fishermen... it is these he instructs; – 'the Itihasa is the Veda'.'

=== Narasimha ===
Narasimha destroyed the Asura-King Hiranyakashipu, who after undertaking severe penances, was granted a boon by Brahma that he could not be killed inside or outside any residence, on the ground or in the sky, or by any god, human, animal, or weapon. The man-lion avatar of Vishnu thus put the demon on His lap and killed him with claws. This concept is similar to that found in the Shatapatha brahmana (Sanskrit transliteration for Kanda XII is not available):

By means of the Surâ-liquor Namuki, the Asura, carried off Indra's (source of) strength, the essence of food, the Soma-drink. He (Indra) hasted up to the Asvins and Sarasvatî, crying, 'I have sworn to Namuki, saying, "I will slay thee neither by day nor by night, neither with staff nor with bow, neither with the palm of my hand nor with the fist, neither with the dry nor with the moist!" and yet has he taken these things from me: seek ye to bring me back these things!

— Satapatha Brahmana, translated by Julius Eggeling (1900), Kanda XII, Adhyaya VII, Brahmana III, Verse 1

D.A. Soifer states that 'Brahmana literature yields what must be considered as the prototype of that [Narasimha] myth, the Indra-Namuchi [or Namuki] myth', adding that other academics such as Devasthali concur that although elements of the Namuchi legend are 'scattered throughout Brahmana literature (cf. VS [Vajaseneyi Samhita] 10.34; PB [Pancavimsa Brahmana] 12.6.8, MS [Maitrayani Samhita] IV.34; TB [Taittiriya Brahmana] 1.7.1.6)', the fullest version is in the Shatapatha Brahmana. Indra defeating Namuchi itself originates from the RigVeda (e.g. 10.73):

tvaṃ jaghantha namuciṃ makhasyuṃ dāsaṃ kṛṇvāna ṛṣayevimāyam |
tvaṃ cakartha manave syonān patho devatrāñjasevayānān ||

— RigVeda transliteration of Book 10, Hymn 73, Verse 7
Translation:

War-loving Namuci thou smotest, robbing the Dāsa of his magic for the Ṛṣi.
For man thou madest ready pleasant pathways, paths leading as it were directly God-ward.

— RigVeda translation by Ralph T.H. Griffith (1896) of Book 10, Hymn 73, Verse 7

=== Vamana ===
Vamana, the dwarf avatar of Vishnu, took back the three worlds from the Asura king Bali (grandson of Prahlada, saved from his father, Hiranyakashipu, by the Narasimha avatar) in three steps.

==== Kanda I, Adhyaya 2, Brahmana 5 ====
devāśca vā asurāśca | ubhaye prājāpatyāḥ paspṛdhire tato devā anuvyamivāsuratha hāsurā menire 'smākamevedaṃ khalu bhuvanamiti

te hocuḥ | hantemām pṛthivīṃ vibhajāmahai tāṃ vibhajyopajīvāmeti tāmaukṣṇaiścarmabhiḥ paścātprāñco vibhajamānā abhīyuḥ

tadvai devāḥ śuśruvuḥ | vibhajante ha vā imāmasurāḥ pṛthivīm preta tadeṣyāmo yatremāmasurā vibhajante ke tataḥ syāma yadasyai na bhajemahīti te yajñameva viṣṇum puraskṛtyeyuḥ

te hocuḥ | anu no 'syām pṛthivyāmābhajatāstveva no 'pyasyām bhāga iti te hāsurā asūyanta ivocuryāvadevaiṣa viṣnurabhiśete tāvadvo dadma iti

vāmano ha viṣnurāsa | taddevā na jihīḍire mahadvai no 'durye no yajñasaṃmitamaduriti

— Satapatha Brahmnana, transliteration of Kanda I, Adhyaya II, Brahmana V, Verses 1–5
Translation:

The gods and the Asuras, both of them sprung from Prajapati, were contending for superiority. Then the gods were worsted, and the Asuras thought: 'To us alone assuredly belongs this world!

They thereupon said: 'Well then, let us divide this world between us; and having divided it, let us subsist thereon!' They accordingly set about dividing it with ox-hides from west to east.

The gods then heard of this, and said: 'The Asuras are actually dividing this earth: come, let us go to where the Asuras are dividing it. For what would become of us, if we were to get no share in it?' Placing Vishnu, (in the shape of) this very sacrifice, at their head, they went (to the Asuras).

They then said: 'Let us share in this earth along with yourselves! Let a part of it be ours!' The Asuras replied rather grudgingly: 'As much as this Vishnu lies upon, and no more, we give you!'

Now Vishnu was a dwarf. The gods, however, were not offended at this, but said: 'Much indeed they gave us, who gave us what is equal in size to the sacrifice.'

— Satapatha Brahmana, translation by Julius Eggeling (1900), Kanda I, Adhyaya II, Brahmana V, Verses 1–5

Eggeling notes that in the Shatapatha Brahmana, 'we have here the germ [i.e. origin] of the Dwarf incarnation of Vishnu'. The difference in this account – aside from no mention of Bali – is that instead of gaining the earth by footsteps, it is gained by as much as Vamana can lie upon as a sacrifice. That this legend developed into Vamana taking three steps, as noted by Aiyangar, originates from the three strides of Vishnu covering the three worlds in the RigVeda (1.22 and 1.154). Notably, the three steps of Vishnu are mentioned throughout the Shatapatha Brahmana as part of the sacrificial rituals described (e.g. SB 1.9.3.12, 5.4.2.6, and 6.7.4.8).

==== Kanda 6, Adhyaya 7, Brahmana 4 ====
SB 6.7.4.8 also explains why the strides of Vishnu are performed in rituals:

sa vai viṣṇukramānkrāntvā | atha tadānīmeva vātsapreṇopatiṣṭhate yathā prayāyātha tadānīmeva vimuñcettādṛktaddevānāṃ vai vidhāmanu manuṣyāstasmādu hedamuta mānuṣo grāmaḥ prayāyātha tadānīmevāvasyati

— Satapatha Brahmnana, transliteration of Kanda VI, Adhyaya VII, Brahmana IV, Verse 8
Translation:

And, again, why the Vishnu-strides and the Vâtsapra rite are (performed). By the Vishnu-strides Prajapati drove up to heaven. He saw that unyoking-place, the Vâtsapra, and unyoked thereat to prevent chafing; for when the yoked (beast) is not unloosed, it is chafed. In like manner the Sacrificer drives up to heaven by the Vishnu-strides; and unyokes by means of the Vâtsapra.

— Satapatha Brahmana, translation by Julius Eggeling (1900), Kanda VI, Adhyaya VII, Brahmana IV, Verse 8

=== Varaha ===
Varaha – also referred to as Yajna-Varaha ('sacrificial boar') – is in Puranic literature explicitly stated to be the symbolic embodiment of sacrifice (including the ritual equipment, offerings, oblations, and altars used). Stated in the Nirukta to be synonymous with clouds and rain (sacrifice produces rain, rain feeds crops, and crops feed living beings), Varaha is most commonly associated with the legend of lifting the Earth out of the Cosmic Waters, and in various accounts also battles and defeats the Asura Hiranyaksa to do so.

==== Kanda 14, Adhyaya 1, Brahmana 2 ====
atha varāhavihatam iyatyagra āsīditīyatī ha vā iyamagre pṛthivyāsa prādeśamātrī tāmemūṣa iti varāha ujjaghāna so'syāḥ patiḥ prajāpatistenaivainametanmithunena priyeṇa dhāmnā samardhayati kṛtsnaṃ karoti makhasya te'dya śiro rādhyāsaṃ devayajane pṛthivyā makhāya tvā makhasya tvā śīrṣṇa ityasāveva bandhuḥ

— Satapatha Brahmnana, transliteration of Kanda XIV, Adhyaya I, Brahmana II ('The making of the pot'), Verse 11
Translation:

Then (earth) torn up by a boar (he takes), with 'Only thus large was she in the beginning,'--for, indeed, only so large was this earth in the beginning, of the size of a span. A boar, called Emûsha, raised her up, and he was her lord Prajapati: with that mate, his heart's delight, he thus supplies and completes him;--'may I this day compass for you Makha's head on the Earth's place of divine worship: for Makha thee! for Makha's head thee!'

— Satapatha Brahmana, translation by Julius Eggeling (1900), Kanda XIV, Adhyaya I, Brahmana II ('The making of the pot'), Verse 11

The context of this verse is in relation to a Pravargya ritual, where clay/earth is dug up, fashioned or 'spread out' into Mahâvîra pots (symbolising the head of Vishnu), and baked in a fire altar (an explanation of Vishnu's decapitation relating to this ritual is given in SB 14.1.1). S. Ghose states that the 'first direct idea of the boar as an incarnation of Vishnu performing the specific task of rescuing the earth is mentioned in the Shatapatha Brahmana... the nucleus of the story of the god rescuing the earth in the boar-shape is found here'. A.B. Keith states that the boar 'is called Emusa [or 'Emûsha' in the SB] from its epithet emusa, [meaning] fierce, in the RigVeda'. However, as this name occurs only once in the RigVeda, the ascribed meaning cannot be verified:

10 All these things Viṣṇu brought, the Lord of ample stride whom thou hadst sent-
A hundred buffaloes, a brew of rice and milk: and Indra, slew the ravening [emuṣam] boar [varaha].

— Rig Veda (translated by R.T.H. Griffith, 1896), Book 8, Hymn 66, Verse 10

विश्वेत् ता विष्णुराभरदुरुक्रमस्त्वेषितः |
शतं महिषान् कषीरपाकमोदनं वराहमिन्द्र एमुषम् ||

— Rigveda 8.66.10 (Note: the transliteration is incorrectly ascribed to hymn 8.77)
Translation:

viśvet tā viṣṇurābharadurukramastveṣitaḥ |
śataṃ mahiṣān kṣīrapākamodanaṃ varāhamindra emuṣam ||

==== Kanda 5, Adhyaya 4, Brahmana 3 ====
atha vārāhyā upānahā upamuñcate | agnau ha vai devā ghṛtakumbham praveśayāṃ cakrustato varāhaḥ sambabhūva tasmādvarāho meduro ghṛtāddhi sambhūtastasmādvarāhe gāvaḥ saṃjānate svamevaitadrasamabhisaṃjānate tatpaśūnāmevaitadrase pratitiṣṭhati tasmādvārāhyā upānahā upamuñcate

athemām pratyavekṣamāṇo japati | pṛthivi mātarmā mā hiṃsīrmo ahaṃ tvāmiti varuṇāddha vā abhiṣiṣicānātpṛthivī bibhayāṃ cakāra mahadvā ayamabhūdyo 'bhyaṣeci yadvai māyaṃ nāvadṛṇīyāditi varuṇa u ha pṛthivyai bibhayāṃ cakāra yadvai meyaṃ nāvadhūnvīteti tadanayaivaitanmitradheyamakuruta na hi mātā putraṃ hinasti na putro mātaram

— Satapatha Brahmnana, transliteration of Kanda V, Adhyaya IV, Brahmana III, Verses 19–20
Translation:

He then puts on shoes of boar’s skin. Now the gods once put a pot of ghee on the fire. There from a boar was produced: hence the boar is fat for it was produced from ghee. Hence also cows readily take to a boar: it is indeed their own essence (life-sap, blood) they are readily taking to. Thus he firmly establishes himself in the essence of the cattle: therefore he puts on shoes of boar’s skin.

Looking down on this (earth) he then mutters, 'O mother Earth, injure me not, nor I thee!’ For the Earth was once afraid of Varuna, when he had been consecrated, thinking, ‘ Something great surely has he become now that he has been consecrated: I fear lest he may rend me asunder! And Varuna also was afraid of the Earth, thinking, I fear lest she may shake me off ! Hence by that (formula) he entered into a friendly relation with her; for a mother does not injure her son, nor does a son injure his mother.

— Satapatha Brahmana, translation by Julius Eggeling (1900), Kanda V, Adhyaya IV, Brahmana III, Verses 19–20

The form of a boar was produced from a sacrificial oblation of the gods, and boars share the essence of cattle (which symbolise prosperity and sacrifice in SB 3.1.4.14, and productiveness in 5.2.5.8). Eggeling notes that in this ceremony, the King wears boar-boots to engage in a mock-battle with a Raganya (a Kshatriya noble or royal), stated to be 'Varuna's consecration; and the Earth is afraid of him'. This ritual therefore seems to be significant as the mock-battle between the King (symbolising the boar) and the Raganya (symbolising Varuna, RigVedic deity of water) parallels the battle between Varaha with the Asura Hiranyaksa in various Puranic accounts of the Earth being saved and lifted out of the waters.

== Manuscripts and Translations ==
All English translations of the Madhyandina School recension are by Julius Eggeling in five volumes. The English translation of the Kanva School recension by W.E. Caland in 3 volumes has not been found or listed; another English translation by the Indira Gandhi National Centre for the Arts (IGNCA) in at least seven volumes has been listed (only the first five volumes can be previewed).

	Sanskrit	Sanskrit-English Transliteration	English
Madhyandina	archive.org: Volume 1, Volume 2, Volume 3, Volume 4, Volume 5, Volume 6, Volume 7	gretil.sub.uni-goettingen.de: Kanda 1, Kanda 2, Kanda 3, Kanda 4, Kanda 5, Kanda 6, Kanda 7, Kanda 8, Kanda 9, Kanda 10, Kanda 11, Kanda 12 (not available), Kanda 13, Kanda 14 (unknown author; e-texts; all Sanskrit e-texts are here).	archive.org: Volume 1, Volume 2, Volume 3, Volume 4, Volume 5 (Part of the Sacred Books of the East; translated by Julius Eggeling)
Madhyandina	vedicheritage.gov.in: Volume 1, Volume 2		Sacred-Texts.com: Volumes 1–5 (Hypertext version of the same the Sacred Books of the East version, translated by Julius Eggeling)
Madhyandina			Wisdomlib.org: Kandas 1–14 (E-text version of the translation by Julius Eggeling, complete with introduction, footnotes, and corrections)
Kanva	vedicheritage.gov.in: Kandas 1–16 (Audio)	gretil.sub.uni-goettingen.de: Adhyayas 1–6 (and Mula text, extracted from commented version)	Google Books: Volume 1, Volume 2, Volume 3, Volume 4, Volume 5; No previews: Volume 6, Volume 7
Kanva	vedicheritage.gov.in: Kandas 1–16 (Audio)	gretil.sub.uni-goettingen.de: Adhyayas 1–6 (and Mula text, extracted from commented version)	archive.org: Brihadaranyaka Upanishad (Khanda 17; Swami Madhavananda)

== See also ==
- Brahmana
- Dashavatara
- Yajnavalkya
- Yajurveda
