= Pravargya =

Vedic ritual ceremony

Originating in historical Vedic religion, 'Pravargya' (Sanskrit प्रवर्ग्य), also known as 'Ashvina-pravaya', is an introductory or preliminary ceremony to the Soma Yajña (of which there are several kinds, including but not limited to, the five-day Agnishtoma Soma Yagya forming the basic model).

In the Pravargya Yajña, an earthen pot is fashioned from clay dug up from the ground, placed on a fire-altar, and used to boil milk which is offered to the Ashvins, the twin Rigvedic gods of Ayurvedic medicine.

As with all Vedic Period sacrificial ceremonies, the Pravargya Yajña is mystical in nature insofar as items, positions, actions, and words have indirect, symbolic meanings, rather than direct (i.e. exoteric) literal meanings (e.g. the pot represents the head of Vishnu which in turn represents the Sun). It is also typical in that numerous and complex rules must be strictly followed by participants to the smallest detail.

Although explanations of and instructions for the performance of the Pravargya Yagya are provided by various Vedic literature such as the Brahmanas, Aranyakas and Shrautasutras, those provided by the Shatapatha Brahmana of the White Yajurveda are particularly notable in Vaishnavism as the likely origin of the Varaha (boar) avatar of the Rigvedic God Vishnu.

== Nomenclature and etymology ==
=== Pravargya ===
'Pravargya' (Sanskrit प्रवर्ग्य) means ' a ceremony introductory to the Soma Yagya (at which fresh milk is poured into a heated vessel called, mahā-viira or gharma, or into boiling ghee)'. It is also similarly defined as a 'ceremony preliminary to the Soma Yagya'. The term seems to be derived from 'Pravarga' (प्रवर्ग), which means 'a large earthenware pot (used in the Pravargya ceremony)'. 'Pravargya' also means 'distinguished' and 'eminent'. Both words seem to be formed from the roots:

- '√pra', meaning 'forward, in front, on, forth'.
- '√vrj', meaning 'to twist off, pull up, pluck, gather', or 'to avert, remove'.

=== Mahāvīra Pot ===
According to A.B. Keith and A.A. Macdonell 'Mahāvīra' (महावीर) 'is the name in the later Samhitās and the Brāmaṇas of a large earthenware pot which could be placed on the [sacrificial] fire, and which was especially employed at the introductory Soma ceremony called Pravargya'.

'Mahāvīra' literally translates to 'great hero', 'thunderbolt', and 'white horse' (which seem to relate to GodKing Indra). It also translates to 'archer', which is particularly notable as two (linked) legends relating to this pot in the Pravargya ceremony concerns Makha and Vishnu respectively being decapitated by their bows (i.e. in the Shatapatha Brahmana, the Mahāvīra earthen pot represents the severed head of Vishnu).

=== Makha ===
According to the Monier-Williams Sanskrit Dictionary, 'Makha' (मख) means 'cheerful, sprightly, vigorous, active, restless', or ' a feast, festival, any occasion of joy or festivity', or 'a Yajña, sacrificial oblation'. Makha is also the name of a nakshatra (star).

=== Varna ===
The class or 'Varna' (वर्ण) system also influenced the proceedings of the Pravargya ceremony. According to the Monier-Williams Sanskrit dictionary, 'Varna' has many different meanings. Generally, it is used to refer to the forms, shapes, appearances, categorisations and arrangements of things. This includes of physical objects, living beings, letters, words, sounds, musical notes, and arrangements of songs and poems. A more specific definition given by the dictionary is also 'class of men, tribe, order, caste... [which is] properly applicable to the four principal classes described in Manu's code, viz. Brāhmans, Kshatriyas, Vaiśyas, and Sūdras; the more modern word for 'caste' being jāti'. The relation between the varna and caste systems is discussed in more detail below.

== Key deities mentioned ==
=== Vishnu ===
Vishnu, stated to be synonymous with the Yagya(Yagyo Vai Vishnuh Yajurveda), is decapitated in a legend relating to the Mahāvīra earthen Pot used in the Pravargya Yagya (e.g. Shatapatha Brahmana 14.1.1).

Synonymous with Krishna, Vishnu is the "preserver" in the Hindu triad (Trimurti) and is revered as the supreme being In Vaishnavism. Also stated to be synonymous with the Yagya (e.g. in the Shatapatha Brahmana, see below), Vishnu is particularly notable for adopting various incarnations (avatars such as Varaha, Rama, and Krishna), time to time in every Yug to preserve and protect dharmic principles whenever the world is threatened with evil, chaos, and destructive forces.

=== The Ashvins ===
In the Pravargya ceremony, a Mahāvīra earthen pot is made and used to boil milk as an oblation to the Ashvins.

W.J. Wilkins states that the 'Asvins are regarded as the physicians of the gods; and are declared to be able to restore to health, the sick, the lame, and the emaciated amongst mortals. They are the special guardians of the slow and backward; the devoted friends of elderly women who are unmarried. They are said to preside over love and marriage, and are implored to being together hearts that love... the Asvins are invoked for "offspring, wealth, victory, destruction of enemies, the preservation of the worshippers themselves, of their houses and cattle'.

In the legend of Vishnu's decapitation, the Yagya is stated to have begun without the Ashvins. Wilkins relates another legend in the Shatapatha Brahmana (4.1.5) that leads to the Ashvins joining the Yagya, and as physicians, using their power to replace the head of Vishnu/Makha as the head of the Yagya (i.e. the Pravargya, itself). Their request to the gods for this was to be granted oblations at the Yagya, which was accepted (hence boiled milk is offered to them in the Pravargya Yagya). The story related by Wilkins is that after attempting and failing twice to take away Sukanya, the young wife of an elderly Rishi called Chyavana, she tells the Ashvins one of the reasons she won't leave her husband for them is because they are imperfect, but will only tell them why after they make her husband young again. They agree, and so she 'tells the Asvins that they are imperfect because they have not been invited to join the other gods in a great Yagya that was to be celebrated at Kurukshetra (where Vishnu/Makha is later decapitated). The Asvins proceed to this Yagya, and, asking to be allowed to join in it, are told they cannot do so, because they have wandered familiarly among men, performing cures. In reply to this, the Asvins declared that the gods were making a headless Yajña. The gods inquiring how this can be, the Asvins reply, "Invite us to join you, and we will tell you." To this the gods consented'.

=== Indra ===
Just as in the Rigveda, Indra is stated to become 'Makhavan' (1.3.43), in the Shatapatha Brahmana it is also stated that Indra 'became Makhavat (possessed of makha)' in a legend relating to the Mahāvīra earthen pot made in the Parvargya Yajña (i.e. the decapitation of Vishnu). Indra is also stated to be the 'slayer of Makha' in the Taittiriya Samhita of the Black Yajurveda (3.2.4). Should the Mahāvīra be broken during the Yajña, Indra is invoked for atonement (Pañcaviṃśa Brāhmaṇa, see below).

In the Vedas, Indra is the king of Svarga (Heaven) and the Devas. He is the deity of the heavens, lightning, thunder, storms, rains, river flows, and war. Indra is the most referred to deity in the Rigveda. He is celebrated for his powers, and the one who kills the great symbolic evil (malevolent type of Asura) named Vritra who obstructs human prosperity and happiness. Indra destroys Vritra and his "deceiving forces", and thereby brings rains and the sunshine as the friend of mankind.

=== Makha ===
'The Rudras, having gathered together the earth', he says; these deities first gathered him together; verily with them he gathers him together. 'Thou art the head of Makha', he says; Makha is the Yagya, the firepan is his head; therefore he says thus.

— Taittiriya Samhita of the Black YajurVeda, translated by Arthur Berriedale Keith (1914), Khanda 5, Prapathaka 1 ('The Placing of the Fire in the Fire-pan'), Section 6

In the Parvargya Yajña, the Mahāvīra earthen pot made from clay is referred to as 'Makha'. In a legend relating to the Mahāvīra, Makha (in the Pañcaviṃśa Brāhmaṇa) or Makha-Vishnu (in the Shatapatha Brahmana and Taittiriya Aranyaka) is decapitated. The pot is referred to as Makha's head, which at the end of the ceremony is used as the symbolic head of a man's body (see below).

The above quote from the Taittiriya Samhita concerns a Soma Yajña to Rudra. Other references to the head of Makha are all in the Taittiriya Samhita (e.g.1.1.8, 1.1.12, and 4.1.5, as well as that quoted above), and all seem to be in relation to Agni, the fire god.

A.A. Macdonell states that 'Makha appears to designate a person in two passages of the Rigveda [9.101.13. where the Bhrgus are mentioned as chasing Makha], but in neither passage does the context explain who he was. Probably a demon of some kind is meant. In the later Samhitas [Vajasaneyi Samhita (White Yajurveda) 11.57; 37.7; Taittiriya Samhita, 1.1.8.1, 3.2.4.1] mention is also made of the 'head of Makha,' an expression which has become unintelligible to the Brahmanas [Shatapatha Brahmana 14.1.2.17].

In regards to this ambiguity, S. Shrava states that 'Innumerable manuscripts of the valuable [Vedic] literature have been lost due to atrocities of the rulers and invaders, ravages of time, and utter disregard and negligence. These factors contributed to the loss of hundreds of manuscripts. Once their number was more than a few hundred. Had these [including Brahmanas] been available today the ambiguity in the interpretation of Vedic hymns could not have crept in'.

==== Brihat Parasara Hora Sastra ====
Notably, according to the Brihat Parasara Hora Sastra (an important book on Vedic Astrology), Makha is a nakshatra (star). The presiding deity of that star is also stated to be the Sun, which is notable given the sun is regarded as the 'soul of all' (i.e. 'best', as in best of or 'head' of the Yagya), and the severed head of Vishnu in various Brahmanic legends is stated to become the sun (see below).

== Summary of the ritual ==
=== Somayaga ===
R.L. Kashyap states that 'Somayaga is a general name for those Yagya in which libations of the soma juice are offered in the duly consecrated fire. There are seven types of Soma Yajnas namely, agnishtoma, atyagnishtoma, ukthya, shodashi, vajapeya, atirata and aptoryama... Agnishtoma is a typical Somayaga, forming the prakriti or model for other Soma Yagya'. Kashyap also details the 5-day Agnishtoma rite, in which the Pravargya ceremony within it is performed on the third and fourth days.

The Somyagyas are still performed. Here is the list of various somyagyas held in recent time.

=== Pravargya ===
The Pravargya rite is complex and involves following numerous strict rules in regards to timing, objects used, placements, movements, actions, and what is said. The summaries given below are very much simplified. Kashyap states that 'The Pravargya must be commenced on the day of the new or full moon, or on a day in the wane when the moon is in an auspicious nakshatra'.

U.M. Vesci states that the Pravargya ritual has two distinct parts:

1. At its beginning, the Mahāvīra earthen pots are prepared, and the milk boiled in them are offered to the Ashvins. This is repeated in the evening for three consecutive days.
2. At its conclusion, the implements used in this ritual, particularly the Mahāvīra are carried in procession to the fire-altar (uttaravedi) and buried there.

A.B. Keith states that from 'clay chosen from a pit east of the Ahavaniya fire, to which a horse leads the way, a Mahavira pot is made, a span high, two spare pots, and various other utensiles. A stool of Munja grass is also made as a throne for the pot. The pot is heated, the milk of a cow and a goat is poured in. Finally, the hot drink is offered to the Asvins, and two Rauhina cakes are also offered in the morning to the day, in the evening to the night. At the outset of the ceremony the wife of the conductor is made to cover her head, but she joins with the rest at the close in the finale of the Saman which is sung. At the end the offering utensils are arranged so as to make up the semblance of a man, the three Mahavira vessels marking the head, and so on... The pot is covered with a golden plate, which can be nothing else than a symbol of fire or the sun, the pot glows, the milk, which in its whiteness is a sun symbol, boils with heat. The Yagya by drinking as usual a share of the milk thus gains power at the same time as the sun is strengthened'.

S. Ketkat agrees, elaborating that at the Pravargya ceremony 'a cauldron [i.e. the Mahāvīra earthen pot] is made red-hot on the sacrificial fire, to represent symbolically the sun; in this cauldron milk is then boiled and offered to the Asvins. The whole celebration is regarded as a great mystery. At the end of it the sacrificial utensils are so arranged that they represent a man: the milk-pots are the head, on which a tuft of sacred grass represents the hair; two milking-pails represent the ears, two little gold leaves the eyes, two cups the heels, the flour sprinkled over the whole the marrow, a mixture of milk and honey the blood, and so on. The prayers and formulae naturally correspond with the mysterious ceremonies'.

== Vedic literature cited ==
The Shrautasutras have not been cited in this article, in part due to difficulty in finding English translations. Instead, English translations of Brahmanas and Aranyakas containing details of the Pravargya ceremony have been cited; these constitute Sruti literature of the Vedas as much as the Samhitas (hymns and mantras).

=== The Brahmanas ===
The Samhitas of the Vedas are generally concerned with hymns and mantras, recited during sacrificial ceremonies such as the pravargya. The Brahmanas are generally commentaries on the Samhitas and provide instructions on the performance of the sacrificial ceremonies. Sharva states that in 'the brahmana literature this word ['brahmana'] has been commonly used as detailing the ritualism related to the different Yagya or yajnas... The known recensions [i.e. schools or Shakhas] of the Vedas, all had separate brahmanas. Most of these brahmanas are not extant.... [Panini] differentiates between the old and the new brahmanas... [he asked] Was it when Krishna Dvaipayana Vyasa had propounded the Vedic recensions? The brahmanas which had been propounded prior to the exposition of recensions by [Vyasa] were called as old brahmanas and those which had been expounded by his disciples were known as new brahmanas'.

=== The Aranyakas ===
J. Dowson states that 'Aranyaka' means 'belonging to the forest' as this type of text is intended to 'expound the mystical sense of the [sacrificial] ceremonies, discuss the nature of God [etc.]. They are attached to the Brahmanas, and [are] intended for study in the forest by brahmanas who have retired from the distractions of the world'. Although the Aranyaka texts are generally best known for containing Upanishads, the Taittiriya Aranyaka is notable for also providing details on the performance of the Parvargya ceremony, which have been published separately as the 'Pravargya Brahmana'.

== Rigveda ==
=== Aitareya Brahmana ===
The Yagya went away from the gods (saying), 'I shall not be your food.' 'No', replied the gods, 'Verily thou shalt be our food.' The gods crushed it; it being taken apart was not sufficient for them. The gods said 'It will not be sufficient for us, being taken apart; come, let us gather together the Yagya.' (They replied) 'Be it so'. They gathered it together; having gathered it together they said to the Açvins, 'Do ye two heal it', the Açvins are the physicians of the gods, the Açvins the Adhvaryus; therefore the two Adhvaryus gather together the cauldron [Mahāvīra pot]. Having gathered it together they say, 'O Brahman, we shall proceed with the Pravargya offering; O Hotṛ, do though recite.'

— Rigveda Brahmanas: The Aitareya And Kausitaki Brahmanas Of The Rigveda, translated by Arthur Berriedale Keith (1920), Aitareya Brahmana, Adhyaya IV, Verse 1 ('The Pravargya')

A.B. Keith states it 'is certainly the case that the two Brahmanas [the Aitareya and Kausitaki] represent for us the development of a single tradition, and there must have been a time when there existed a single Bahrvea text... the Soma Yagya alone forms the real subject of the [Aitareya] book'. The above-quoted verse itself explains why the Ashvins are offered an oblation in the Pravargya ceremony (i.e. putting together or 'healing' the Mahāvīra Pot from the clay dug up), and the process of gathering itself may link to the name 'Pravargya' (i.e. as above, the root-word '√vrj', means 'to pull up, pluck, gather').

The Pravargya Yagya is itself is detailed in Pancika (book) 1, Adhyaya (chapter) 4, verses 1-22. The overall placement of the Pravargya as an early or introductory ceremony of the overall Soma Yagya is (Pancika II, Adhyaya III onwards is not detailed here):

Pancika	Adhyaya	Name	Verses / Comment
I (The Soma Yagya)	I	The Consecration Rites	
I (The Soma Yagya)	II	The Introductory Yagya	
I (The Soma Yagya)	III	The Buying and Bringing of the Soma	
I (The Soma Yagya)	IV	The Pravargya	Chapter includes the Upasad and Tanuaptra rites.
I (The Soma Yagya)	V	The carrying forward of the fire, Soma, and the offerings to the High Altar	
II (The Soma Yagya continued)	I	The Animal Yagya	Rice-cakes etc., are offered symbolically as animal Yagya.
II (The Soma Yagya continued)	II	The Animal Yagya (continued) and the Morning litany	2.2.9 (p. 141) states 'The [rice] cake (which is offered) is the victim which is killed'.

=== Kauṣītaki Brahmana ===
The Mahāvīra is the head of the Yagya... it is the self of the Yagya; verily thus with the self he completes the Yagya. The Mahāvīra is he yonder that gives heat; verily thus he delights him... The man of whom men speak in the sun us Indra, is Prajapati, is the holy power; thus herein the conductor attains identity if [the] world and union with all the deities.

— Rigveda Brahmanas: The Aitareya And Kausitaki Brahmanas Of The Rigveda, translated by Arthur Berriedale Keith (1920), Kausitaki Brahmana, Adhyaya VIII, Verse 3 ('The Pravargya')

A.B. Keith states about the Kauṣītaki Brahmana that 'the first four Adhyayas cover fully enough for a Brahmana the Agnyadhana, the Agnihotra, the new and full moon Yagyas, and then follows a section on the function of the Brahman priest before the seventh Adhyaya carries us to the discussion of the Soma Yagya with occupies the rest of the book'. The extensive and elaborate Soma Yagya is thus detailed throughout Adhyayas 7-30 (i.e. 23 of 30 chapters); the Pravargya Yagya is itself is detailed Adhyaya 8, verses 3–7. The overall placement of the Pravargya as an introductory part of the overall Soma Yagya is (Adhyaya IX onwards is not detailed here):

Adhyaya	Name	Verses	Ceremony / Yagya
VII	The Soma Yagya	1-4	The Consecration
VII	The Soma Yagya	5-9	Introductory Yagya
VII	The Soma Yagya	10	The Purchase of Soma
VIII	The Soma Yagya (continued)	1-2	The Guest Reception
VIII	The Soma Yagya (continued)	3-7	The Pravargya
VIII	The Soma Yagya (continued)	8-9	The Upasads
IX	The Soma Yagya (continued)	--	

== Samaveda ==
=== Pañcaviṃśa Brāhmaṇa ===
If the Mahāvīra (the pot used at the pravargya-ceremony) breaks, he should touch, when it is broken (muttering the three verses): 'He, who, even without a clamp, before the piercing of the neck-ropes, makes the combination, he, the bountiful, the one of much good, removes again what is spoiled. - Let us not fear as strangers, o Indra, as removed from thee! O God with the thunderbolt, we thought ourselves ill-famed, as trees that are devoid (of leaves). - We thought ourselves slow and weak, o Slayer of Vrtra! May we once more, O Hero, through thy great liberality be gladdened after our praise', (with these verses) he should touch the broken Mahāvīra (pot). This is therefore the atonement.

— Pancavimsa Brahmana, translated by W. Caland (1931), Prapathaka IX (9), Adhyaya 10 ('Expiations for various occasions'), Verse 1

C. Majumdar states that the Panchavimsha Brahmana 'is one of the oldest and most important of Brahmanas... and includes the Vratyastoma, a ceremony by which people of non-Aryan stock could be admitted into the Aryan family'. R. Pandey elaborates, adding that 'According to the scriptures, persons [also] outcast for nonperformance [i.e. of Yagya] were eligible to re-admission into the Aryan fold after performing the Vratyastoma Yagya'.

In terms of content, the Pañcaviṃśa Brāhmaṇa seems to focus on numerous other sacrificial rites (e.g. the Vratyastoma), rather than the Soma Yagya, of which the Pravargya ritual is an early part. However, of the two direct references found, the above-quoted verse from prapathaka (chapter) 9, Adhyaya (section) 10 entitled 'Expiations for various occasions' instructs the performers of the Pravargya ritual of what to do should one or more of the Mahāvīra pot(s) break in order to atone and continue the Yagya.

==== Makha decapitated ====
The Gods Agni, Indra, Vayu, and Makha, desirous of glory, performed a sacrificial session. They said: 'The glory that will come to (one of) us, must be in common to (all of) us'. Of them it was Makha to whom the glory came. He took it and stepped forth. They tried to take it from him by force and hemmed him in. He stood there, leaning on his bow, but the end of the bow, springing upwards, cut off his head. This (head) became the pravargya; Makha, forsooth, is the Yagya; by holding the pravargya (ceremony), they put the head on the Yagya.

— Pancavimsa Brahmana, translated by W. Caland (1931), Prapathaka VII (7), Adhyaya 5 ('The samans of the midday pavamana laud'), Verse 6

This seems to be made in reference to Indra slaying Makha as mentioned in the Taittiriya Samhita (3.2.4) of the Black Yajurveda. The above-quote from the Panchavimsha Brahmana is particularly notable for three reasons (all detailed below). First, altered versions of this exact legend are contained in the Shatapatha Brahmana (White Yajurveda) and the Taittiriya Aranyaka (Black Yajurveda) where it is Vishnu that completes the Yagya and is decapitated, although He is still referred to as Makha in the Pravargya ritual. Second (again, as detailed below), the head is symbolically the highest, best, or most important, and thus the Pravargya ceremony as the head of the (Soma) Yagya is the highest, best, or most important part of it. And third, again, the word 'Mahāvīra' can also be translated as 'archer' (see above), hence the possible presence of a bow.

== Yajurveda ==
=== White Yajurveda: Shatapatha Brahmana ===
J. Eggeling states that 'The fourteenth kânda, up to the beginning of the Brihad-âranyaka, is entirely taken up with the exposition of the Pravargya, an important, though optional and subsidiary, ceremony performed on the Upasad-days of Soma-Yagya... the preparation of a hot draught of milk and ghee, the Gharma, which the Yagya has to take, after oblations have been made thereof to various deities, the whole rite is treated with a considerable amount of mystic solemnity calculated to impart to it an air of unusual significance. A special importance is, however, attached to the rough clay pot, used for boiling the draught, and manufactured and baked in the course of the performance itself; it is called Mahâvîra, i.e. the great man or hero, and Samrâg, or sovereign lord, and is made the object of fervid adoration as though it were a veritable deity of well-nigh paramount power. Although the history of this ceremony is somewhat obscure, the place assigned to it in the Soma-ritual would lead one to suppose that its introduction must have taken place at a time when the main procedure of the Soma-Yagya had already been definitely settled'.

Seemingly self-contained rather than presented as a part of the Soma Yagya, the structure of Khanda 14 (the last book) of the Shatapatha Brahmana is:

Adhyaya	Brahmana(s)	Title	Comment
I	1	The Pravargya	Vishnu's decapitation is here.
I	2-4	The making of the Pot	The Mahāvīra Pot for the Pravargya. The origin of the legend of Varaha is here.
II	1-2	The boiling of the Gharma, and the offerings	
III	1	The setting out of the Pravargya	
III	2	Expiatory Ceremonies	Rules to follow when something goes wrong.

==== Vishnu decapitated ====
Now he who is this Vishnu is the Yagya; and he who is this Yagya is yonder Âditya (the sun). But, indeed, Vishnu was unable to control that (love of) glory of his; and so even now not every one can control that (love of) glory of his. Taking his bow, together with three arrows, he stepped forth. He stood, resting his head on the end of the bow. Not daring to attack him, the gods sat themselves down all around him.

Then the ants said--these ants (vamrî), doubtless, were that (kind called) 'upadîkâ' -- 'What would ye give to him who should gnaw the bowstring?'--'We would give him the (constant) enjoyment of food, and he would find water even in the desert: so we would give him every enjoyment of food.' -- 'So be it,' they said.

Having gone nigh unto him, they gnawed his bowstring. When it was cut, the ends of the bow, springing asunder, cut off Vishnu's head. It fell with (the sound) 'ghriṅ'; and on falling it became yonder sun. And the rest (of the body) lay stretched out (with the top part) towards the east. And inasmuch as it fell with (the sound) 'ghriṅ,' therefrom the Gharma (was called); and inasmuch as he was stretched out (pra-vrig,), therefrom the Pravargya (took its name).

The gods spake, 'Verily, our great hero (mahân virah) has fallen:' therefrom the Mahâvîra pot (was named). And the vital sap which flowed from him they wiped up (sam-mrig) with their hands, whence the Samrâg.

— Satapatha Brahmana, translated by Julius Eggeling (1900), Kanda XIV, Adhyaya I, Brahmana I ('The Pravargya'), Verses 6-11

The above-quoted account from the Shatapatha Brahmana seems to be an altered and elaborated version of the same legend from the Panchavimsha Brahmana. The most notable changes are that Vishnu is present at the Yagya, and the bow-string snaps and decapitates Him this time as a result of ants gnawing at it. As mentioned before, the word 'Mahāvīra' can also be translated as 'great hero' and 'archer' (see above). As noted earlier, there is also a reference to Indra slaying Makha as mentioned in the Taittiriya Samhita (3.2.4) of the Black Yajurveda, from which this legend may be derived.

The legend given here is that 'the gods Agni, Indra, Soma, Makha, Vishnu, and the [Visvedevas], except the two Asvins, performed a sacrificial session', which was first attained by Vishnu, hence 'he became the most excellent of the gods'. Upadika ants then agreed with the other gods to gnaw at the bowstring of Vishnu while He rested his head on the Bow, in exchange for the boon to 'find water even in the desert' (as 'all food is water').

The Gharma (hot beverage offered as an oblation) is named after the sound of Vishnu's head hitting the ground (which 'on falling became yonder sun'), and 'inasmuch as he [Vishnu] stretched out (pra-vrig) on the ground, therefrom the Pravargya (took its name)'. The body of Vishnu is encompassed by Indra, who possessed by His glory 'became Makhavat (possessed of makha)'. Vishnu is then divided into three parts, with Agni receiving the first (morning) portion, Indra the second (midday) portion, and the remaining Visvedevas the third portion.

==== Digging up clay to form Makha's head ====
He then takes the lump of clay with the (right) hand and spade on the right (south) side, and with the (left) hand alone on the left (north) side, with (Vâg. S. XXXVII, 3), 'O divine Heaven and Earth,'--for when the Yagya had its head cut off, its sap flowed away, and entered the sky and the earth: what clay (firm matter) there was that is this (earth), and what water there was that is yonder (sky); hence it is of clay and water that the Mahâvîra (vessels) are made: he thus supplies and completes it (the Pravargya) with that sap; wherefore he says, 'O divine Heaven and Earth,'--'May I this day compass for you Makha's head,'--Makha being the Yagya, he thus says, 'May I this day accomplish for you the head of the Yagya;'--'on the Earth's place of divine worship,'--for on a place of divine worship of the earth he prepares it;--'for Makha thee! for Makha's head thee!'--Makha being the Yagya, he thus says, 'For the Yagya (I consecrate) thee, for the head of the Yagya (I consecrate) thee.'

— Satapatha Brahmana, translated by Julius Eggeling (1900), Kanda XIV, Adhyaya I, Brahmana II ('The Making of the Pot'), Verse 9

As illustrated, as the clay is dug up and fashioned into Mahāvīra pots, the participant refers to the Vajasaneyi Samhita of the White Yajurveda, specifically Book 37, Verse 3 (i.e. 'Vâg. S. XXXVII, 3') to state it – representing the head of Vishnu – is the head of Makha:

O Heaven and Earth divine, may I duly prepare for you
this day the head of Makha on the place of earth where
the Gods Yagya.

— Vajasaneyi Samhita of the White YajurVeda, translated by Ralph T.H. Griffith (1899), Book XXXVII (37), Verse 3

==== Symbolism of Makha's head ====
When the Yagya had its head cut off, its vital sap flowed out, and thence these plants grew up: with that life-sap he thus supplies and completes it. And as to why he places it north (of Soma's seat),--Soma is the Yagya, and the Pravargya is its head; but the head is higher (uttara): therefore he places it north (uttara) of it. Moreover, Soma is king, and the Pravargya is emperor, and the imperial dignity is higher than the royal: therefore he places it north of it.

— Satapatha Brahmana, translated by Julius Eggeling (1900), Kanda XIV, Adhyaya I, Brahmana III, Verse 12

The above quote shows that symbolically, the head is associated with what is 'higher' and therefore what is best or of greatest importance. This is why the Mahāvīra Pot symbolically represents the head of Vishnu in the Shatapatha Brahmana. Particularly as Vishnu is explicitly stated to be 'the Yagya' in the Brahmanas (e.g. Shatapatha Brahmana 1.7.4.20, 1.1.4.9, 3.2.1.38, 3.6.3.3, 5.2.3.6, 5.4.5.1, 5.4.5.18, 11.4.1.4, 12.5.4.11, 14.1.1.13, and 11.4.1.4), the head of Vishnu is thus the best or highest part of it.

A more explicit account of the symbolic importance of the head is however provided in the first book of this Brahmana (1.4.5.5), which states 'the head (siras) represents excellence (srî), for the head does indeed represent excellence: hence, of one who is the most excellent (sreshtha) of a community, people say that he is 'the head of that community'.'

==== Legend of the Boar (Varaha) ====
atha varāhavihatam iyatyagra āsīditīyatī ha vā iyamagre pṛthivyāsa prādeśamātrī tāmemūṣa iti varāha ujjaghāna so'syāḥ patiḥ prajāpatistenaivainametanmithunena priyeṇa dhāmnā samardhayati kṛtsnaṃ karoti makhasya te'dya śiro rādhyāsaṃ devayajane pṛthivyā makhāya tvā makhasya tvā śīrṣṇa ityasāveva bandhuḥ

— Satapatha Brahmnana, transliteration of Kanda XIV, Adhyaya I, Brahmana II ('The making of the pot'), Verse 11
Translation:

Then (earth) torn up by a boar (he takes), with 'Only thus large was she in the beginning,'--for, indeed, only so large was this earth in the beginning, of the size of a span. A boar, called Emûsha, raised her up, and he was her lord Prajapati: with that mate, his heart's delight, he thus supplies and completes him;--'may I this day compass for you Makha's head on the Earth's place of divine worship: for Makha thee! for Makha's head thee!'

— Satapatha Brahmana, translation by Julius Eggeling (1900), Kanda XIV, Adhyaya I, Brahmana II ('The making of the pot'), Verse 11

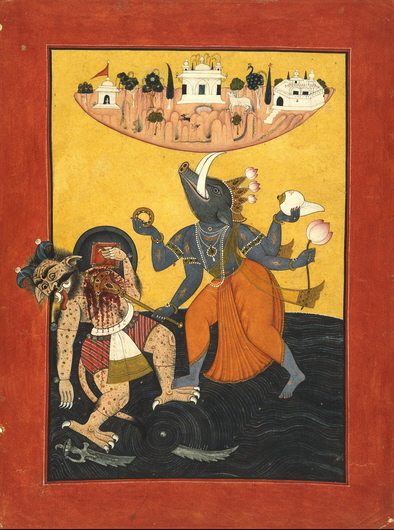
Varaha, the boar avatar of Vishnu.

As illustrated, the above brief legend is given in respect to digging up the clay to make the Mahāvīra pots as part of the Pravargya Yagya. The participant again refers to Vajasaneyi Samhita of the White Yajurveda, this time specifically Book 37, Verse 5 (i.e. 'Vâg. S. XXXVII, 5'):

Only so large was it at first. Duly may I prepare for you
this day the head of Makha on earth's place where the
Gods Yagya.
For Makha thee, thee for the head of Makha!

— Vajasaneyi Samhita of the White YajurVeda, translated by Ralph T.H. Griffith (1899), Book XXXVII (37), Verse 3

N Aiyangar believes that Book 37 of the Vajasaneyi Samhita, cited in the ceremony, may be the origin of the Earth being lifted by the boar (i.e. earth lifted by oblations / Yagya). Directly relating to this, S. Ghose adds that the 'first direct idea of the boar as an incarnation of Vishnu performing the specific task of rescuing the earth is mentioned in the Satapatha Brahmana... the nucleus of the story of the god rescuing the earth in the boar-shape is found here'. A.B. Keith agrees, repeating that this 'boar, which is called Emusa from its epithet emusa, fierce, in the Rigveda, is stated...to have raised up the earth from the waters [in the Shatapatha Brahmana]'.

=== Black Yajurveda: Taittiriya Aranyaka ===
He who performs the Pravargya ritual indeed, ensures that the head of the Yagya is in its proper place. Thus, performing the Yagya that is inclusive of the head, the yajna-performer obtains the desired fruits and also wins heaven. Therefore this Pravargya may be called āshvina-pravayā i.e. that Pravargya in which the Ashwin mantras have gained importance.

— Krishna Yajur Veda Taittirīya Āraṇyaka: Text in Devanāgari, Translation and Notes (Vol 2), by S. Jamadagni (trans.) and R.L. Kashyap (ed.), Prapāṭhaka 5, Anuvaka 1, Verse 7

The Pravargya Yajna is not detailed in the Taittiriya Brahmana, but rather the Aranyaka attached to it. In respect to the above quote, a more complete (and different) translation is provided below in respect to the decapitation of Vishnu relating to the Mahāvīra earthen pot used in ritual.

R. Mitra states that the Taittiriya Aranyaka is 'by far the largest of the Aranyakas. It extends altogether to ten prapāṭhakas or 'Great Lessons', i.e. books or chapters, of which the last four are Upanishads, and the first six, are Aranyaka strictly so-called'. In regards to the Pravargya rite, prapāṭhaka (chapter) 4 provides the mantras to be used, and prapāṭhaka (chapter) 5 details the performance of the ceremony itself:

Prapāṭhaka	Title	Comment
1	Propitiation of the Eastern Altar - Uttara Vedi	
2	Brahmanic Education	
3	Mantras of the Chaturhotra-Chiti	
4	Pravargya Mantras	Used for the Pravargya ceremony
5	Pravargya Ceremony	Pravargya Brahmana
6	Pitrimedha or Rites for the welfare of the Manes	
7	S'iksha or the training necessary for acquiring a knowledge of Brahma	Taittiriya Upanishad
8	Knowledge of Brahma	Taittiriya Upanishad
9	Relation of Brahma to food, mind, life, etc.	Taittiriya Upanishad
10	The worship of Brahma	Mahanarayana Upanishad

==== Makha / Vishnu decapitated ====
The gods, desirous of glory, were attending a Yagya complete in every respect. They said, 'whatever glory first comes to us, that shall be common to us all.' Kurukeshetra was their altar... The Maruts were the earth dug from it. Glory came to Makha Vaishnava among their number. This glory he eagerly desired; with it he departed. The gods followed him, seeking to obtain (this) glory. From the left (hand) of him while thus followed, a bow was produced, and from his right hand arrows. Hence a bow and arrows have a holy origin, for they are sprung from Yagya.

Though many, they could not overcome him, though he was only one. Therefore many men without bows and arrows cannot overcome one hero who has a bow and arrows... he stood leaning on his bow. The ants said [to the gods], 'Let us choose a boon; and after that we shall subject him to you. Wherever we dig, let us open up water.' Hence wherever ants dig, the open up water. For this was the boon which they chose. They knawed his (Vishnu's) bowstring. How his, starting asunder, hurled his head upwards. It travelled through heaven and earth. From its so travelling (pravartata), the pravargya derives its name. From its falling with the sound of ghram, gharma obtained its name. Strength (virya) fell from the mighty one (mahatah): hence the mahavira got its name...

The gods said to the Asvins, 'Ye two are physicians, replace this head of the Yagya.' They said 'Let us ask a boon, let our graha (libation of Soma) be offered here also.' (The gods accordingly) recognised this Asvina (libation) for them. (The Asvins) replaced this head of the Yagya, which is the Pravargya... When one offers the pravargya, then he replaces the head of the Yagya. Sacrificing with the Yagya with a head, a man obtains blessings, and conquers heaven. Hence this pravargys is principally effcacious through texts addressed to the Asvins.

— Original Sanskrit Texts (Vol 4) by J. Muir (1873), translation of the Taittiriya Aranyaka (Prapāṭhaka 5, Anuvaka 1, Verses 1-7)

This, again, seems to be another altered version of the same legend found in the Panchavimsha Brahmana (Samaveda) and Shatapatha Brahmana (White Yajurveda). This version – likely later than the Shatapatha as it is contained in an Aranyaka, a type of text attached to Brahmanas, which are in turn attached to the Samhitas – is particularly notable for providing much additional clarity in respect to the mystical nature of the Pravargya ceremony. Again, 'Mahāvīra' means 'great hero' and 'archer', both of which are explicitly mentioned here, as is digging up the earth, and why the milk boiled in the Mahāvīra earthen pots are offered as libations to the Asvins in the Pravargya. The above quote also seems, like the Shatapatha, to imply Makha and Vishnu are synonymous.

== Influence of the Varna System ==
=== Varna vs caste ===
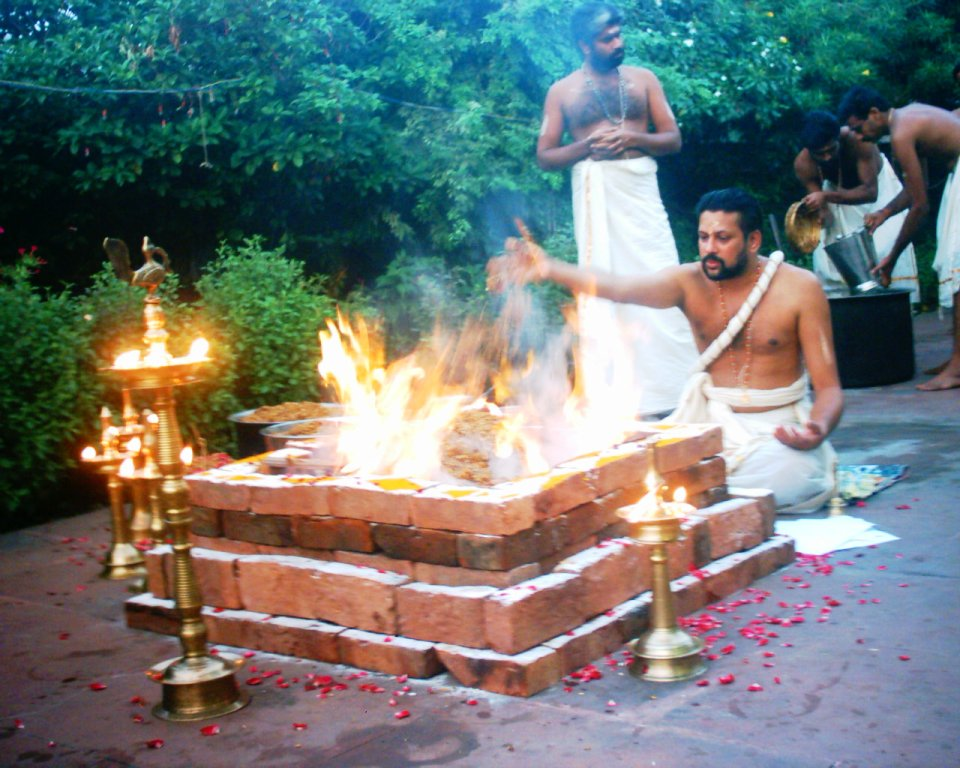
Performance of a Yajna.

The Varna System refers to the general division of Vedic society into four classes: Brāhmans (priestly class), Kshatriyas (warrior and administrative class, including royalty), Vaiśyas (merchant class), and Sūdras (labouring class). To understand the influence of this Varna system in the Pravargya ceremony, it is first necessary to differentiate it from the modern caste system. As evidenced below, the varna and caste systems are not the same; only 'varna' is a Sanskrit word, and unlike the caste system, the varna system allowed both for movement between the classes and for non-Aryans to become Aryans (Aryans could also become outcastes and no longer considered Aryan).

First, whereas 'varna' (वर्ण) is a Sanskrit word with a broad range of meanings relating to forms and arrangements, 'caste' is not, having originated from the Portuguese word 'casta', which unlike 'varna', specifically refers to race. Thus, the varna system of class (e.g. based on occupation) is not the caste system of race.

Second, whereas the modern caste system is rigid and hereditary, P. Mitra states about the Varna system that there 'are differences of opinion – whether trades and professions of these [four] classes led to the formation of castes in the later period. But professions were not hereditary, [and] rather could be followed by any Aryan member. Had the caste system developed into rigid form in the vedic period then surely there would have been the mention of caste in the Rigveda... it [the caste system] did not develop out of the four Aryan varnas, and the two systems [i.e. varna and caste] have never been thoroughly harmonized'.

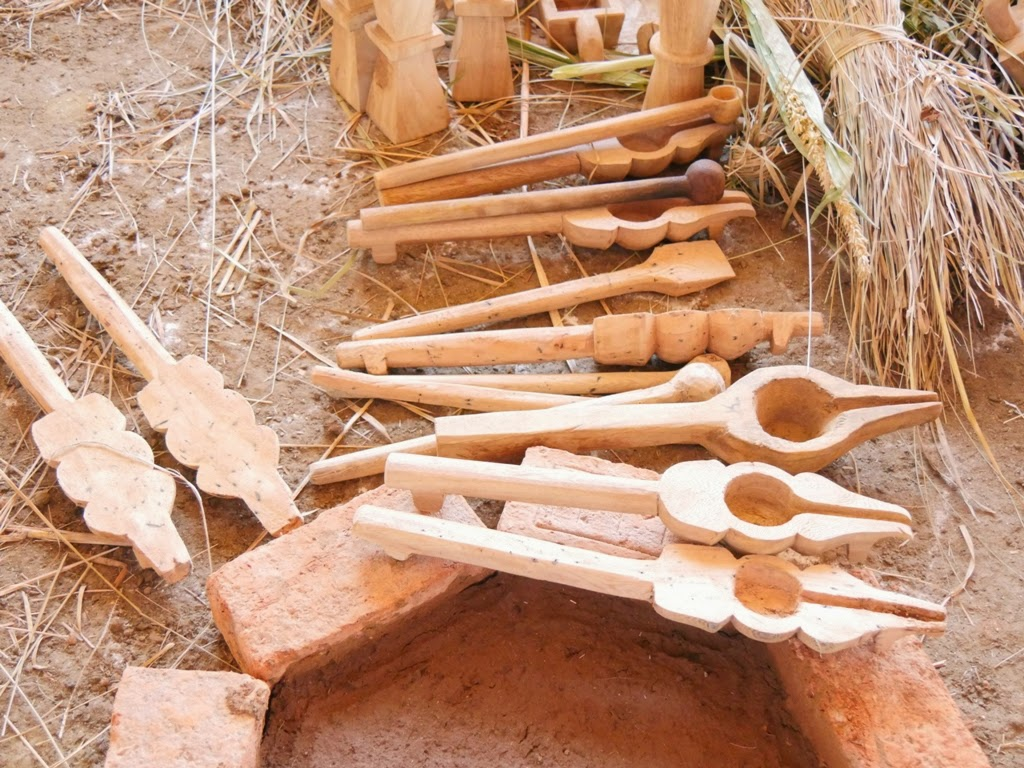
Yajna implements.

Third, whereas the modern caste system does not allow non-Aryans to become Aryans, the varna system does, as proven by Vedic literature such as the Panchavimsha Brahmana of the Samaveda (see above).

Pandey also states that 'in times of distress the members of the higher castes could adopt the occupations of the lower caste. But the members of the lower caste were not allowed to follow the occupations of the higher castes'. However, this assertion seems to be contradicted by S.R. Bakshi, who states the Brahmin 'author of the Aitareya Brahmana [of the Rigveda], Mahidasa, had a Sudra mother, while the Rishi, Kavasha Aliusha, was born of a Dasi [i.e. a servant, concubine or dancing girl]'. However, A. Sharma and R. Bharati question whether Mahidasa was a sudra as 'far fetched'. There are other examples of Sudra Brahmins and Rishis, and it is notable that the mythical sage Narada Muni was also the son of a maidservant initiated by Brahmins (e.g. Bhagavata Purana 1.6.6).

=== Exclusion of Ṥūdras ===
According to A.B. Keith and A.A. Macdonell at 'the Pravargya (introductory Soma) rite the performer is not allowed to come in contact with a Ṥūdra, who here [in the Pancavimsa Brahmana], as in the Kathaka Samhita [of the Black Yajurveda] is reckoned as excluded from a share in the Soma-draught'.
