= Sam-Samhitas =

Sam-Samhitas refers to Samhitas of Samaveda, which consists of mantras or hymns in the form of songs and are meant for liturgy.
