= Taittiriya Shakha =

Shakha of the Krishna (black) Yajurveda

The Taittirīya Shakha (Sanskrit, loosely meaning 'Branch or School of the sage Tittiri'), is a shakha (i.e. 'branch', 'school', or rescension) of the Krishna (black) Yajurveda. The Taittiriyas are themselves divided into numerous sub-schools. Among these, the followers of Baudhayana and Apastamba were found all over South India (including Maharashtra), while the Hiranyakeshins were found mainly in Konkan and Western Maharashtra. The Vaikhanasas have a more eastern presence- around Tirupati and Chennai. The Vadhulas are present currently in Kerala and earlier in adjacent parts of Tamil Nadu. The Agniveshyas, a subdivision of the Vadhula immigrants from Malabar, are found around Thanjavur in Tamil Nadu. The Apastamba, Hiranyakeshin, Vaikhanasa and Baudhayana schools have survived with all their texts intact, it consists of the Taittirīya Samhita ('TS'), Taittirīya Brahmana ('TB'), Taittirīya Aranyaka ('TA'), and Taittirīya Pratisakhya ('TP').

== Nomenclature ==
The 'Taittiriya Shakha' can be loosely translated as 'Branch or School of (the sage) Tittri' or 'Branch or School of Taittiriya' or 'School of the pupils of Tittiri'.

- 'Taittiriya' is derived from the name of the sage Taittiri (or Tittiri).
- 'Shakha' means 'branch' or 'school'.

== Origin ==
=== Monier-Williams ===
According to Monier-Williams Sanskrit-English Dictionary, Taittiri was a pupil of Yaska (estimated 4th-5th century BCE). According to the Vishnu Purana, Yaska was in turn a pupil of Vaiśaṃpāyana (estimated 6th century BCE). Taittiri is also stated in the Mahabharata to have attended 'the Yajña conducted by Uparicaravasu'.

=== Vishnu Purana ===
'Tittiri' also means 'partridge'. This meaning is worked into the account of the stated origin of the School of Tittri in the Vishnu Purana (Book 3, Chapter 5). Following a division between Brahmins at Mount Meru - including Vaiśampáyana (whose pupil, Tittiri, is attributed to the Krishna (black) Yajurveda) and Yajnavalkya (attributed to the Shukla (White) Yajurveda) – 'The other scholars of Vaiśampáyana, transforming themselves to partridges (Tittiri), picked up the texts which he [Yájnawalkya] had disgorged, and which from that circumstance were called Taittiríya'. This indicates both Yaska and Taittiri were pupils of Vaiśampáyana.

The translator, H.H. Wilson, states in his commentary to this chapter that 'the term Taittiríya is more rationally accounted for in the Anukramańí or index of the black Yajush [Krishna YajurVeda]. It is there said that Vaiśampáyana taught it to Yaska, who taught it to Tittiri, who also became a teacher; whence the term Taittiríya, for a grammatical rule explains it to mean, 'The Taittiríyas are those who read what was said or repeated by Tittiri'.'

=== Nirukta ===
Yaska, attributed as the teacher of Taittiri, is also attributed as the author of the Nirukta, a study of etymology concerned with correct interpretation of Sanskrit words in the Vedas. This is significant as the Nirukta references and quotes extensively from the Taittiriya texts (e.g. as listed in Appendix 1 of the Nirukta).

== Overview ==
The Taittiriya school of the Krishna (black) Yajurveda produced several types of texts constituting Sruti Vedic literature (of the YajurVeda). These are the:

- Taittiriya Samhita: Seven books of hymns and mantras. Includes Brahmana and Anukramani (index) sections. One of four total Samhitas of the Krishna YajurVeda.
- Taittiriya Brahmana: Three books of hymns, mantras, legends, astronomy, and – typical of Brahmana texts – instructions on the performance of sacrificial rites.
- Taittiriya Aranyaka: Ten books of hymns, mantras, and – typical of Aranyaka texts – Vedic theology constituting two Upanishads.
- Taittiriya Pratisakhya: One book concerned with phonetics, that is, the correct pronunciation of words.

=== Notable members ===
According to B.R. Modak, the scholar Sayana (died 1387 CE), notable for his commentaries on Vedic literature including the Taittirīya texts, was a member of the Taittiriya Shakha. According to G.R. Garg, Apastamba, notable for his Shrautasutras, was also a member.

=== Commentaries ===
The 'Śrauta Sútras' (or Shrautasutras) of Apastamba (450–350 BCE), Bodhayana (500–200 BCE), and Vaikhanasa.(300–100 BCE) are theological texts concerned with procedures and ceremonies of Vedic ritual practice. All are attached to the Taittiriya Samhita.

There are other commentaries written by Sanskrit scholars and philosophers on the works of the Taittiriya Shakha. Most notably, according to B.R. Modak, Sayana wrote commentaries on the Taittirīya texts (and others). According to N. Sharva, the Taittirīya Brāhmaṇa was also commented upon by Bhava Swāmī (circa 700 CE or earlier); Kauśika Bhaṭṭa Bhāskara Miśra (preceding and referred to by Sayana in the Nirukta and by Devarāja Yajvā in the Nighantu); and Rāmānḍara / Rāmāgnichitta.

== Taittiriya Samhita ==
R. Dalal states that 'The Yajur Veda consists of passages in verse and prose, arranged for the performance of yajnas (sacrifices)... The two main versions of the Yajur are known as the Shukla (or "white") Yajur Veda and the Krishna (or 'Black') Yajur Veda... of the black Yajur Veda, five shakhas are known: the Taittiriya (Apastamba), Kapishthala (Hiranyakesi), Katha, Kathaka (school of the Kaṭhas), and Maitrayani (Kalapa), with four closely related recensions, known as the Kathaka Samhita, the Kapishthala-Katha Samhita, Maitrayani Samhita, and the Taittiriya Samhita'.

=== Structure and Content ===
The Taittiriya Samhita ('TS') consists of seven kandas (or 'books') of hymns, mantras, prayers, and three Anukramanis (indexes). In translations such as that by A.B. Keith, this Samhita is presented as the Krishna (black) Yajurveda. M. Winternitz adds that the Samhita also includes Brahmana passages (i.e. instructions and explanations of sacrificial ceremonies). The chapters (prapāṭhakas) for each of the books (kandas) of the Taittiriya Samhita are as follows:

- Kanda 1
  - Prapāṭhaka 1: The new and full moon sacrifices
  - Prapāṭhaka 2: The Soma sacrifice
  - Prapāṭhaka 3: The Victim for Agni and Soma
  - Prapāṭhaka 4: The Soma cups
  - Prapāṭhaka 5: The Rekindling of the Fire
  - Prapāṭhakas 6-7: The sacrificer's part in the new and full moon sacrifices
  - Prapāṭhaka 8: The Rajasuya
- Kanda 2
  - Prapāṭhaka 1: The special animal sacrifices
  - Prapāṭhakas 2-4: The special sacrifices
  - Prapāṭhakas 5-6: The new and full moon sacrifices
- Kanda 3
  - Prapāṭhakas 1-3: The supplement to the Soma sacrifice
  - Prapāṭhaka 4: The optional and occasional offerings
  - Prapāṭhaka 5: Miscellaneous supplements
- Kanda 4
  - Prapāṭhaka 1: The lacing of the fire in the fire-pan.
  - Prapāṭhaka 2: The reparation of the ground for the fire
  - Prapāṭhaka 3: The five layers of bricks
  - Prapāṭhaka 4: The fifth layer of bricks
  - Prapāṭhaka 5: The offerings to Rudra
  - Prapāṭhaka 6: The preparation of the fire
  - Prapāṭhaka 7: The piling of the fire (continued)
- Kanda 5
  - Prapāṭhaka 1: The placing of the fire in the fire-pan
  - Prapāṭhaka 2: The preparation of the ground for the fire
  - Prapāṭhaka 3: The second and later layers of bricks
  - Prapāṭhakas 4-7: The piling of the fire altar (continued)
- Kanda 6
  - Prapāṭhakas 1-5: The exposition of the Soma sacrifice.
  - Prapāṭhaka 6: Exposition of the Daksina and other offerings
- Kanda 7
  - Prapāṭhaka 1: The Ekaha and Ahina Sacrifices
  - Prapāṭhaka 2: The Ahina sacrifices (continued)
  - Prapāṭhakas 3-4: The Sattras.
  - Prapāṭhaka 5: The Gavam Ayana

=== Nakshatras ===
D.M. Harness states that 'The Vedic Nakshatras [stars] arose from a spiritual perception of the cosmos. Nakshatras are the mansions of the Gods or cosmic powers and of the Rishis or sages. They can also project negative or anti-divine forces, just as certain planets like Saturn have well known malefic effects. The term Nakshatra refers to a means (tra) of worship (naksha) or approach... The Nakshatras dispense the fruits of karma... For this reason Vedic rituals and meditations to the present day follow the timing of the Nakshatras... [which] are of prime [importance] in muhurta or electional astrology for determining favorable times for actions, particularly sacramental or sacred actions like marriage'.

Reference to the Nakṣhatra Sūktam (star positions relating to new and full moon ceremonies), occurs in kāṇḍa (book) 3, prapāṭhaka (chapter) 5, anuvākaḥ (section) 1 (3.5.1).

=== Shaivism ===
==== Shri Rudram and Namah Shivaya homages to Shiva ====
The Shri Rudram Chamakam and Namah Shivaya, homages to Rudra / Shiva (the supreme deity in Shaivism), occur in kāṇḍa (book) 4, prapāṭhakas (chapters) 5 and 7 (4.5 and 4.7).

=== Vaishnavism ===
==== The Varaha Avatara of Vishnu ====
Varaha, the boar avatar of Vishnu (listed in the Dashavatara, or ten primary incarnation of Vishnu) is primarily associated with the Puranic legend of lifting the Earth out of the cosmic ocean. A.A. Macdonell and R. Janmajit both state that the origin and development of the boar avatar is found in the Taittiriya Samhita, albeit initially as a form of Prajapati:

This was in the beginning the waters, the ocean. In it Prajapati becoming the wind moved. He saw her, and becoming a boar he seized her. Her, becoming Viçvakarma, he wiped. She extended, she became the earth, and hence the earth is called the earth (lit. 'the extended'). In her Prajapati made effort. He produced the gods, Vasus, Rudras, and Adityas.

— Taittiriya Samhita, translated by Arthur Berriedale Keith (1914), Kanda VII ('The Exposition of the Sattras; The Ahina Sacrifices'), Prapathaka I (vii.1.5)

Another extract attributed to the early development of the Varaha avatar by Macdonell is:

Now a boar, stealer of the good, keeps the wealth of the Asuras which is to be won beyond the seven hills. Him smite, if thou art he who smites in the stronghold. He [Indra] plucked out a bunch of Darbha grass, pierced the seven hills, and smote him. He said, 'Thou art called he who brings from the stronghold; bring him.' So the sacrifice bore off the sacrifice for them; in that they won the wealth of the Asuras which was to be won (védyam), that alone is the reason why the Vedi is so called. The Asuras indeed at first owned the earth, the gods had so much as one seated can espy.

— Taittiriya Samhita, translated by Arthur Berriedale Keith (1914), Kanda VI ('The Exposition of Soma Sacrifice'), Prapathaka II (vi. 2. 4)

== Taittiriya Brahmana ==
When the completion of yajna does not happen in a year (samvatsara) then everything is not stable. Then one has to seek the grace of Vishnu (Vamana) by performing a special rite on the ekadashi day. Yajna means Vishnu (worshipping Vishnu). They perform yajna only for stabilising. They depend on Indra and Agni. Indra and Agni give the abode for Gods (devas). Devas only seek shelter in them and only depend on them.

— Taittiriya Brahmana, translated by R.L. Kashyap (2017), Ashtaka 1, Prapathaka 2, Anuvaka 5, Verses 1-7

The Taittirīya Brāhmaņa ('TB') is considered by academics to be an appendix or extension of the Taittirīya Samhita. The first two books (ashṭakas) largely consist of hymns and mantras to the Vedic-era Devas, as well as mythology, astronomy, and astrology (i.e. the Nakshatras); the third book contains commentaries and instructions on Vedic sacrificial rites such as the Purushamedha, Kaukili-Sutramani, Ashvamedha, and Agnicayana. Recorded around 300-400 BCE, it was prevalent in southern India in areas such in Andhra Pradesh, south and east of Narmada (Gujarat), and areas on the banks of the Godavari river down to the sea in the states of Karnataka, Tamil Nadu, Maharashtra and Telangana.

A.B Keith states that 'at a comparatively early period the formulae [i.e. mantras from the Samhitas of the YajurVeda] were accompanied by explanations, called Brahmanas, texts pertaining to the Brahman or sacred lore, in which the different acts of the ritual were given symbolical interpretations, the words of the texts commented on, and stories told to illustrate the sacrificial performance... a mass of old material, partly formulae, partly Brahmana, which had not been incorporated in the Taittiriya Samhita was collected together in the Taittiriya Brahmana, which in part contains matter more recent than the Samhita, but in part has matter as old as, at any rate, the later portions of that text'.

=== Structure and Content ===
Based on information provided by Kashyap and R. Mitra, the chapters (prapāṭhakas) for each of the books (ashṭakas or sometimes referred to as kandas) are as follows:

- Ashṭaka 1: Pārakshudra
  - Prapāṭhaka 1: Explanation for the establishment of Agni
  - Prapāṭhaka 2: (Devas, chants, Vishuvat, Solstices, Mahavrata, and the bird-shaped altar)
  - Prapāṭhaka 3: Vajapeya Yajna
  - Prapāṭhaka 4: Explanation of Soma offerings
  - Prapāṭhaka 5: The powers of stars or nakshatras, rites and RigVeda Mantras
  - Prapāṭhaka 6: (Unknown)
  - Prapāṭhaka 7: (Unknown)
  - Prapāṭhaka 8: (Unknown)
- Ashṭaka 2: Agnihotra
  - Prapāṭhaka 1: The Agnihotra Sacrifice
  - Prapāṭhaka 2: Dasahotra Sacrifice
  - Prapāṭhaka 3: Dasahotra Sacrifices concluded
  - Prapāṭhaka 4: Mantras for Subsidiary Sacrifices or Upahomas
  - Prapāṭhaka 5: Mantras for Subsidiary Sacrifices or Upahomas (Concluded)
  - Prapāṭhaka 6: Kaukila Sautramani or the Sacrifice with Spirituous Liquor
  - Prapāṭhaka 7: Ephemeral Sacrifices or Savas
  - Prapāṭhaka 8: Sacrifices with especial prayers (Kamya)
- Ashṭaka 3: (Various)
  - Prapāṭhaka 1: Sacrifices to the Constellations - Nakshatra Ishti
  - Prapāṭhaka 2: Dars'a Ya'ga or Sacrifices meet on the wane of the Moon
  - Prapāṭhaka 3: Paurnamasa Ishti or Ceremonies to be performed on the full moon
  - Prapāṭhaka 4: On Human sacrifices
  - Prapāṭhaka 5: Ishti Sacrifices
  - Prapāṭhaka 6: Pa'Shuka Hotra
  - Prapāṭhaka 7: Expiations for defects in the performance of ceremonies
  - Prapāṭhaka 8: On the operations of the first day of the Asvamedha sacrifice
  - Prapāṭhaka 9: On the operations of the second and third days of the horse sacrifice
  - Prapāṭhaka 10: Sa'vitra-Chayana or collection of fire for the adoration of the sun
  - Prapāṭhaka 11: Nachiketa-Chayana, or collection of Nachiketa Fire
  - Prapāṭhaka 12: Cha-tur-hotra and Vaisvasrij ceremonies

== Taittiriya Aranyaka ==
The Taittiriya Aranyaka ('TA') is primarily a theological text consisting of ten chapters (prapāṭhakas). J. Dowson states that 'Aranyaka' means 'belonging to the forest' as this type of text is intended to 'expound the mystical sense of the [sacrificial] ceremonies, discuss the nature of God [etc.]. They are attached to the Brahmanas, and [are] intended for study in the forest by people who have retired from the distractions of the world'. As illustrated below, the Taittiriya Aranyaka contains a Brahmana text of its own, the Pravargya Brahmana, as well as two Upanishads, the Taittiriya Upanishad (a Muktika or primary Upanishad) and the Mahanarayana Upanishad (a minor Vaishnava Upanishad).

=== Structure and Content ===
R. Mitra states that the Taittiriya Aranyaka is 'by far the largest of the Aranyakas. It extends altogether to ten prapāṭhakas or 'Great Lessons', i.e. books or chapters, of which the last four are Upanishads, and the first six, are Aranyaka strictly so-called'. The 10 chapters (prapāṭhakas) of the Taittiriya Aranyaka, including numbers of anuvakas (sections) for each, are as follows:

Prapāṭhaka	Anuvakas	Description	Comment
1	32	Propitiation of the Eastern Altar - Uttara Vedi	
2	20	Brahmanic Education	
3	21	Mantras of the Chaturhotra-Chiti	
4	42	Pravargya Mantras	Used for the Pravargya ceremony
5	12	Pravargya Ceremony	Pravargya Brahmana
6	12	Pitrimedha or Rites for the welfare of the Manes	
7	12	Śikṣa or the training necessary for acquiring a knowledge of Brahman	Taittiriya Upanishad
8	9	Knowledge of Brahman	Taittiriya Upanishad
9	10	Relation of Brahman to food, mind, life, etc.	Taittiriya Upanishad
10	54	The worship of Brahman	Mahanarayana Upanishad

=== Vaishnavism ===
The Mahanarayana Upanishad is classified as a Vaishnava Upanishad. In addition to this, the Taittiriya Aranyaka is also considered significant by academics in the development of the avatars (or incarnations) and their associated legends of the RigVedic god Vishnu, the supreme being in Vaishnavism.

==== The Varaha Avatara of Vishnu ====
A. Daniélou states that a hundred-armed black boar lifts the earth out of the waters in the Taittiriya Aranyaka (TA 10.1.8). J. Eggeling in note 451:1 to the Shatapatha Brahmana (relating to the Shukla or White Yajurveda) incorrectly states it was 'a black boar with a thousand arms'. The Journal Of The Indian Society Of Oriental Art (volume 13) states 'in the ‘Taittiriya Aranyaka’, the earth is said to have been raised by a black boar with a hundred arms (‘varahena krsnena satabahuna uddhrta’). It is an easily understandable step to the making of the boar an incarnation of Visnu himself, a step which is finally taken in the epics and the Puranas'. This legend is also contained in the Mahanarayana Upanishad (prapāṭhaka 10 of the Taittiriya Aranyaka):

bhūmirdhenurdharaṇī lokadhāriṇī uddhṛtāsi varāheṇa kṛṣṇena śatabāhunā

The earth [Bhumi] is the giver of happiness like the milk cow, the sustainer of life and support for all living beings. (Represented as such the earth is addressed:) Thou wert raised up by Kṛṣṇa in His incarnation of the boar having hundred hands.

— Mahanarayana Upanishad, Prapāṭhaka 10, Anuvaka 1, Khandika 38

As 'Krishna' also means 'black', the verse can also be interpreted as 'black boar' or 'raised up by the black boar', as stated by Daniélou and Eggeling. However, the translation given above clearly shows how Krishna is linked with Varaha.

==== The Kurma Avatara of Vishnu ====
N. Aiyangar states that the following verse from the Taittiriya Aranyaka (prapāṭhaka 1.23-25) 'is narrated in connection with the ritual called Arunaketuka-kayana, in which the tortoise ['Kurma'] is placed below the uttara-vedi [altar]. In it Prajapati or his juice the Tortoise is called Arunaketu (one who had red rays)':

The waters, this (universe), were salilam (chaotic liquid) only. Prajapati alone came into being on a lotus leaf. Within his mind, desire (Kama) around as 'Let me bring forth this (universe).' Therefore what man gets at by mind that he utters by word and that he does by deed... He (Prajapati desired to bring forth the universe) performed tapas (austere religious contemplation). Having performed tapas, he shook his body. From his flesh sprang forth Aruna-Ketus, (red rays as) the Vatarasana Rishis, from his nakhas, nails, the Vaikhanasas, from his valas, hair, the Valakhilyas, and his rasa, juice, (became) a bhutam (a strange being, viz.,) a tortoise moving in the middle of the water. He [Prajapati] addressed him thus 'you have come into being from my skin and flesh.' 'No,' he replied, 'I have been here even from before (purvan eva asam).' This is the reason of the Purusha-hood of Purusha. He (the tortoise) sprang forth, becoming the Purusha of a thousand heads, thousand eyes, thousand feet. He (Prajapati) told him, 'you have been from before and so you the Before make this (idam purvah kurushva).'... From the waters indeed was this (universe) born. All this is Brahman Svayambhu (Self-Born).

— Essays On Indo Aryan Mythology by Narayan Aiyangar ('The Tortoise')

The Vātaraśanāḥ Rishis (or Munis) created are also mentioned in RigVeda 10.136, where Shiva drank water/poison, linking to the legend of Kurma and the churning of the Ocean of Milk, referred to as the Samudra manthan. Prajapati then encounters a tortoise (Kurma/Arunaketu) that existed even before he, the creator of the universe, came into being.

== Taittiriya Pratisakhya ==
The Taittiriya Pratisakhya ('TP') is concerned with phonetics, i.e. the correct pronunciation of words.

=== Structure and Content ===
The 24 chapters of the Taittiriya Pratisakhya are as follows:

1. List of sounds
2. Origin of sounds
3. Shortening of vowels
4. Pragraha or uncombinable words
5. Sanhita or combination of words
6. Conversions of s and visarjaniya into sh.
7. Conversion of n into ṇ
8. Changes of unaspirated surds
9. Changes of h, ah, áh, n, ṉ, án, in, etc.
10. Coalescence of vowels
11. Elision of vowels
12. Elision of vowels
13. Elision of m
14. Duplication
15. Nasalization
16. the use of n
17. Various opinions about nasality
18. Opinions about the aspiration of Om
19. Emphasis and shaking
20. Different kinds of circumflex letters
21. Division of consonants in syllabication
22. Formation of articulate sounds, tones, pitch, long and short syllables, etc.
23. Articulation
24. Various kinds of texts, and qualifications of Vedic teachers and readers

== Manuscripts and translations ==
	Samhita	Brahmana	Aranyaka	Pratisakhya
Sanskrit	archive.org	archive.org: Book 1, Book 2, Book 3	archive.org	archive.org
Sanskrit-English transliteration		archive.org: Part 1 and Part 2		
English	archive.org: Kandas 1-3 and Kandas 4-7 (Keith); sacred-texts.com: Full e-text (Keith)	Volume 1 and Volume 2 (Kashyap; partial translation; limited preview)	Volume 1 and Volume 2 (S. Jamadagni; partial translation; limited preview)	archive.org (W.D. Whitney)
English	archive.org: Kandas 1-3 and Kandas 4-7 (Keith); sacred-texts.com: Full e-text (Keith)	Volume 1 and Volume 2 (Kashyap; partial translation; limited preview)	archive.org: Taittiriya Upanishad (S.S. Sastri); Taittiriya Upanishad (A.M. Sasti)	archive.org (W.D. Whitney)

=== Supplemental ===
- Ápastamba's Śrauta Sútra (Sanskrit) edited by D. Garbe (1882): Prasnas 1-7 and Prasnas 8-15
