= Taittirīya =

Taittirīya may refer to:

- Taittiriya Shakha, a shakha (school) of the Black Yajurveda (Krishna Yajurveda), a scripture of Hinduism
  - Taittiriya Samhita, a rescension of the Black Yajurveda according to this shakha
  - Taittirīya Brāhmaṇa, an expository text on the Black Yajurveda
  - Taittiriya Aranyaka, a philosophical treatise on the Black Yajurveda
    - Taittiriya Upanishad, a mystical text on the Black Yajurveda, part of the Aranyaka
