= Titram =

Coordinates: 29°43′N 76°24′E

Titram (IPA- tɪtrʌm) is a village situated in Kaithal District of north Indian state of Haryana.It is believed that ancient Indian religious texts Taittiriya Samhita and Taittiriya Upanishad were written around this very area.

It was established by four brothers named Dhanna, Niannu, Lachia and Daun, migrated from Kailram village. They were of Kundu gotra, as a village can not be established (kheda nahi band sakta) without the other gotra hence they invited malik gotra's people from Jhyanna and Sismor villages. Now there are five mohalls on the name of these establishers.

It has a good population of schedule caste. In schedulecaste Valmiki caste with [Ratti] gotra are really empowered as they have so much government jobs.

== Demographics ==
Titram village has population of 4309, in the residing 752 families, of which 2341 are males while 1968 are females as per Population Census 2011. Literacy rate of Titram village was nearly 70%.Male literacy stands at 79.35% while female literacy rate was 57.14%.
