= Anukramaṇī =

The Anukramaṇī (Sanskrit: अनुक्रमणी, Anukramaṇī) (also Anukramaṇikā) are the systematic indices of Vedic hymns recording poetic meter, content, and traditions of authorship.

== Anukramanis of the Rigveda ==
Six Anukramanis of the Rigveda are ascribed to Shaunaka: Anuvakanukramani, Arshanukramani, Chandonukramani, Devatanukramani, Padanukramani and Suktanukramani. Except the Anuvakakramani, other Anukramanis survive only in quotations found in the writings of Shadgurashishya.

The most important Anukramani of the Rigveda is Katyayana's Sarvanukramani (ca.mid fourth century BCE), recording the first word, the number of verses, name and family of poets (rshis), names of deities and metres for each of the 1,028 hymns of the Rigveda. The Vedarthadipika, written by Shadgurushishya (12th century) is a significant commentary of this work.

Mayrhofer (2003) discusses the personal names contained in the Rigveda Anukramani, counting 543 items. Academic opinion regarding the age and authenticity of the tradition of these names is not unanimous. Mayrhofer suggests that Hermann Oldenberg (1888) was essentially correct in assuming that

"the editors of the lists of authors [...] [possessed] a correct notion of the families associated with these Mandalas [the Rigvedic "family books" 2–7], possibly rooted in tradition. Beyond this, they do not betray as much as the slightest sign of any genuine tradition on the hymn authors." (p. 229)

Another view is set forth by Stephanie W. Jamison and Joel P. Brereton in the 2014 English translation of the Rigveda:

Even though the anukramaṇīs were composed and redacted long after the R̥gvedic period, they are an invaluable resource, for, by and large, their identifications of the poets of hymns are plausible.

== Anukramanis of the other Vedas ==
The Arsheya Brahmana is the earliest Anukramani of the Samaveda, belonging to its Kauthuma shakha. The Jaiminiya Arsheya Brahmana is a later Anukramani of the Samaveda belonging to its Jaiminiya shakha.

There are three Anukramanis of the Yajurveda belonging to the Atreyi shakha of the Taittiriyasamhita, Charayaniya shakha (known as Mantrarshadhyaya) and Madhyandina shakha of the Vajasaneyisamhita ascribed to Katyayana.

The Brihatsarvanukramani and the Atharvavediyapancpatalika are the Anukramanis of the Atharvaveda. The Brihatsarvanukramani is a complete index of the Atharvavedasamhita in 10 patalas.
