= GRETIL =

The Göttingen Register of Electronic Texts in Indian Languages (GRETIL) is a comprehensive repository of e-texts in Sanskrit and other Indian languages. It contains several texts related to Indology, such as philosophical texts. Rather than scanned books or typeset PDF files, these texts are in plain text, in a variety of encodings, and are machine-readable, so that (for instance) word search can be performed on them. It was started by Reinhold Grünendahl, with the intention of being a "cumulative register of the numerous download sites for electronic texts in Indian languages". It is used by many scholars; for instance, David Smith writes: "Sanskritists are enormously indebted to this incomparably useful site and to those who have contributed e-texts to it."
