= Julius Eggeling =

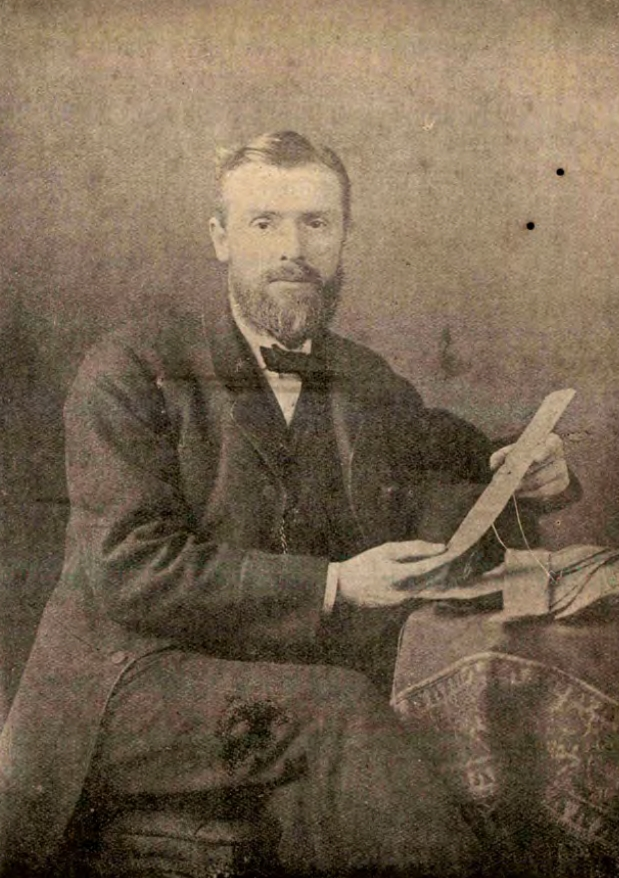

Heinrich Julius Eggeling (12 July 1842 – 13 March 1918) was German-born professor of Sanskrit at the University of Edinburgh from 1875 to 1914, second holder of its Regius Chair of Sanskrit, and Secretary of the Royal Asiatic Society, London.

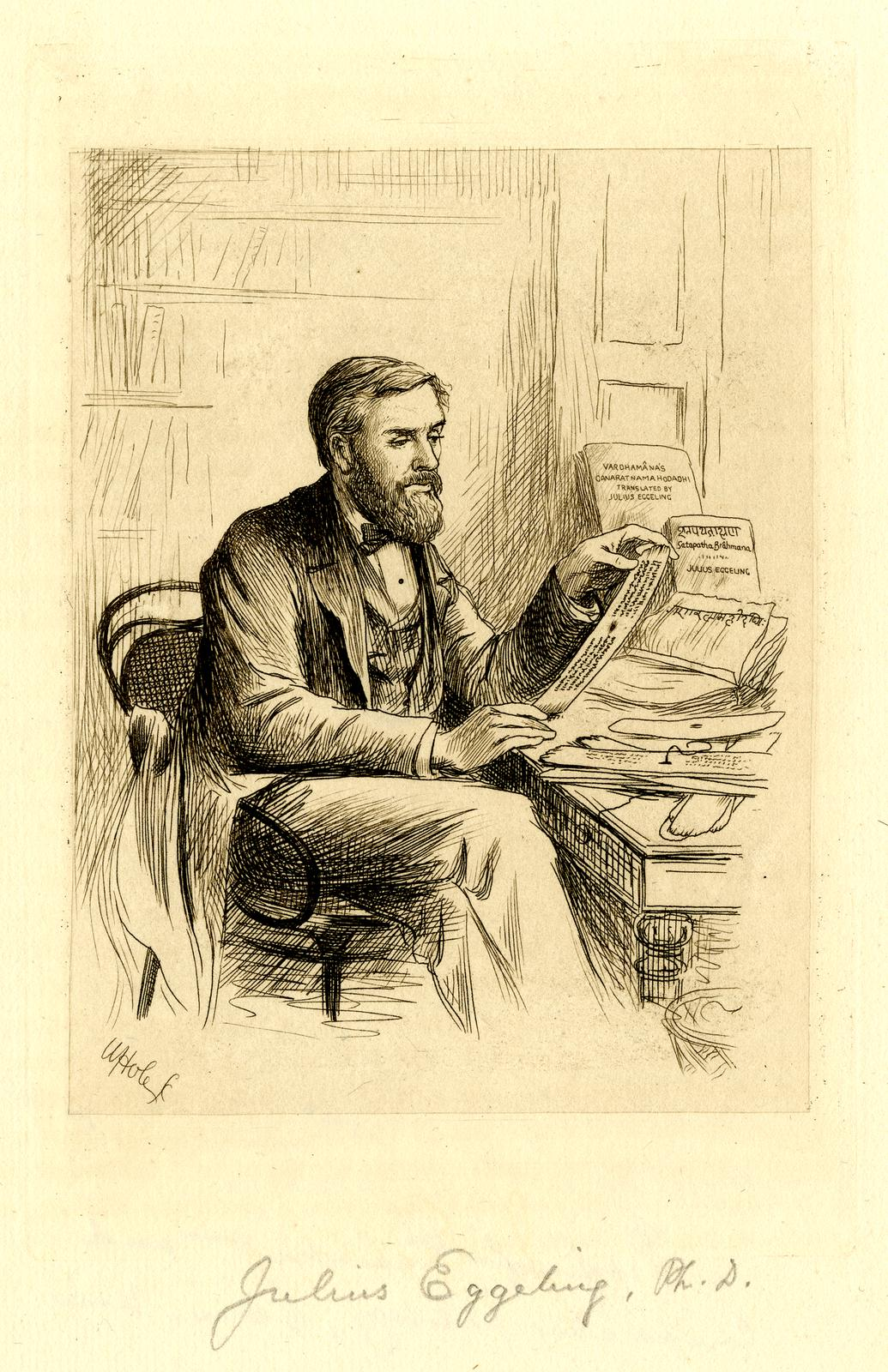
Sketch of Eggeling by William Brassey Hole (1846 - 1917)

Eggeling was born in Hecklingen near the Harz and went to gymnasium in Bernburg after which he studied classical philology at the University of Breslau. Along with Rhys Davids, he studied Sanskrit under Adolf Friedrich Stenzler. He then went to Berlin University to study under Albrecht Weber and went to England in 1867 to study Sanskrit manuscripts in the India Office. He then worked with Max Müller. He became a secretary of the Royal Asiatic Society. He also became a professor of Sanskrit at the University College, London, in 1873. He moved to Edinburgh in 1875, replacing Theodor Aufrecht. He retired in 1914. Eggeling was translator and editor of the Satapatha Brahmana in 5 volumes of the monumental Sacred Books of the East series edited by Max Müller, author of the main article on Sanskrit in the Encyclopædia Britannica, and curator of the University Library from 1900 to 1913. In August 1914 he left for a vacation in his native Germany when the war broke out. His German passport was invalid and he could not obtain an English nationality by naturalization, but because of World War I, he was unable to much despite efforts from Scotland. He then sent his resignation to Edinburgh University and lived with his daughter in Westphalia and died in 1918.

He lived on Brunstane Road in Joppa, Edinburgh.
