= Samhita =

Indian Hindu text, the oldest layer of the Vedas

Samhita (IAST: Saṃhitā) literally means "put together, joined, union", a "collection", and "a methodical, rule-based combination of text or verses". Saṃhitā also refers to the most ancient layer of text in the Vedas, consisting of mantras, hymns, prayers, litanies and benedictions.

Parts of Vedic Samhitas constitute the oldest living part of Hindu tradition.

== Etymology ==
Samhita is a Sanskrit word from the prefix sam (सम्), 'together', and hita (हित), the past participle of the verbal root dhā (धा) 'put'. The combination word thus means "put together, joined, compose, arrangement, place together, union", something that agrees or conforms to a principle such as dharma or in accordance with justice, and "connected with". Samhitā (संहिता) in the feminine form of the past participle, is used as a noun meaning "conjunction, connection, union", "combination of letters according to euphonic rules", or "any methodically arranged collection of texts or verses".

== Discussion ==
In the most generic context, a Samhita may refer to any methodical collection of text or verses: any shastra, sutra, or Sanskrit Epic, along with Vedic texts, might be referred to as a Samhita.

Samhita in contemporary literature, however, typically refers to the bodies of metrically precise texts which make up the most archaic parts of each Veda: these are mantras (sacred sounds with or without literal meaning), as well as panegyrics, prayers, litanies and benedictions petitioning nature or Vedic deities. A Vedic Samhita is, therefore, the collection of such texts as found in one of the Vedas (Rigveda, Yajurveda, Samaveda and Atharvaveda).

The Vedas have been divided into four styles of texts – the Samhitas (mantras and benedictions), the Brahmanas (text on rituals, ceremonies, sacrifices and symbolic-sacrifices), the Aranyakas (commentaries on rituals, ceremonies and sacrifices), and the Upanishads (text discussing meditation, philosophy and spiritual knowledge). The Samhitas are sometimes identified as karma-khanda (कर्म खण्ड, action / ritual-related section), while the Upanishads are identified as jnana-khanda (ज्ञान खण्ड, knowledge / spirituality-related section). The Aranyakas and Brahmanas are variously classified, sometimes as the ceremonial karma-khanda, other times (or parts of them) as the jnana-khanda.

The Vedic Samhitas were chanted during ceremonies and rituals, and parts of it remain the oldest living part of Hindu tradition.

A collective study of Vedas and later text suggests that the compendium of Samhitas and associated Vedic texts were far larger than currently available. However, most have been lost at some point or over a period of Indian history.

Historically, there were five recensions of the Rigveda Samhita, but now only one survives. The Samaveda has three Samhitas (Kauthuma, Rāṇāyanīya and Jaiminiya), two of which are quite similar, while the Atharvaveda has two. The term "samhita" also appears in titles of some non-Vedic texts like the Pancharatra Samhitas and the Brhat Samhita, an astrological work, as well as in the Bhagavata Purana, which self-references as a samhita.

== Examples ==
=== Rig veda ===
The Gayatri mantra is among the famous Hindu mantras. It is found in Rig Veda Samhita.

:ॐ भूर्भुवस्वः। तत्सवितुर्वरेण्यम्। भर्गो देवस्य धीमहि। धियो यो नः प्रचोदयात् – Rig Veda 3.62.10

=== Sama veda ===
Weber noted that the Samhita of Samaveda is an anthology taken from the Rigveda-Samhita. The difference is in the refinement and application of arts such as melody, meters of music, and literary composition. Thus, the root hymn that later became the Rathantara (Excellent Chariot) mantra chant is found in both Rigveda and Samaveda Samhitas, as follows,

Rigveda form:
Abhi tva sura nonumo 'dugdha iva dhenavah | isanam asya jagatah svardrsam isanam indra tasthusah

Samaveda form:
obhitvasuranonumova | adugdha iva dhenava isanamasya jagatassuvardrsam | isanama indra | ta sthu sa o va ha u va | as ||

Translation (same for both):
We cry out for you, hero, like unmilked cows to the lord of the living world !
To the lord of the unmoving world whose eye is the sun, O Indra !

=== Yajur veda ===
The Yajur Veda consists of:

1. Āpastamba-mantra-pāṭhá (Kr̥ṣṇa-yajur-vedá)

2. Kāṭha-saṁhitā́ (Kr̥ṣṇa-yajur-vedá)

3. Kapiṣṭhala-kāṭha-saṁhitā́ (Kr̥ṣṇa-yajur-vedá)

4. Māitrāyaṇa-saṁhitā́ (Kr̥ṣṇa-yajur-vedá)

5. Tāittirīya-saṁhitā́ (Kr̥ṣṇa-yajur-vedá)

6. Vājasaneya-saṁhitā́ (Şukla-yajur-vedá) with (Kāṇvá and Mā́dhyaṁdina as sub-divisions)

Of these six, the Tāittirīya and the Vājasaneya saṁhitā́-s are the most extant ones. The Āpastamba-mantra-pāṭhá consists of mantras only found in the Āpastamba Kalpa sūtrá literature of the Kr̥ṣṇa-yajur-vedá.

The hymns in Section 4.1.5 of the Yajurveda Samhita, dedicated to several ancient deities, state:

May the Vasus prepare you, with the gayatri meter, you are the earth,
May the Rudras prepare you, with the tristubh meter, you are the sky.
May the Adityas prepare you, with the jagati meter, you are the heaven.
May the Visvedevas, common to all men, prepare you, with the anustubh meter, you are the directions.
You are the unchanging direction, make unchanging in me children, abundance of wealth, abundance of cattle, abundance of heroism.

— Taittiriya Samhita, 4.1.5

=== Atharva veda ===
A hymn in the Atharva Veda Samhita, for example, is a woman's petition to deity Agni, to attract suitors and a good husband.

May O Agni!, a suitor after this girl's heart come to her,
May he come to this maiden with fortune!
May she be agreeable to suitors, charming at festivals, promptly obtain happiness through a husband!

— Atharva Veda, 2.36

=== Post-Vedic Samhitas ===
There are many well known books written in the post-vedic period, also known as samhitas, because the word "samhita" also means "systematic compilation of knowledge". Vedic samhitas should not be confused with these samhitas of post-vedic period.

Some post-vedic Samhitas are –

- Ashtavakra Gita
- Bhrigu Samhita
- Charaka Samhita
- Garga Samhita
- Gheranda Samhita
- Kashyap Samhita
- Shiva Samhita
- Brihat Samhita
- Sushruta Samhita (a treatise on food and medicine)
- Yogayajnavalkya Samhita
- Shandilya Samhita

== See also ==
- Aranyaka
- Brahmana
- Upanishad
- Veda
