= Recension =

Practice of editing or revising a text based on critical analysis

Recension is the practice of editing or revising a text based on critical analysis. When referring to manuscripts, this may be a revision by another author. The term is derived from the Latin recensio ("review, analysis").

In textual criticism (as is the case with Biblical scholarship), the count noun recension is a family of manuscripts sharing similar traits; for example, the Alexandrian text-type may be referred to as the "Alexandrian recension". The term recension may also refer to the process of collecting and analyzing source texts in order to establish a tree structure leading backward to a hypothetical original text.

"An adequate method of recension has only been rendered possible by the growth of Palaeography, i.e. the scientific study of ancient documents – the hands in which they are written, the age to which they belong and generally speaking the purposes, methods and circumstances of the men who produced them."

== See also ==
- Biblical manuscript
- Categories of New Testament manuscripts
- Critical apparatus
