= Arthur Berriedale Keith =

Scottish constitutional lawyer and Indologist

Arthur Berriedale Keith FBA
- Born: April 5, 1879; Edinburgh, Scotland
- Died: October 6, 1944 (aged 65); Edinburgh, Scotland
- Spouse: Margaret Balfour Allan

Academic background
- Education: Balliol College, Oxford; University of Edinburgh

Academic work
- Discipline: Constitutional law, Sanskrit, South Asian studies

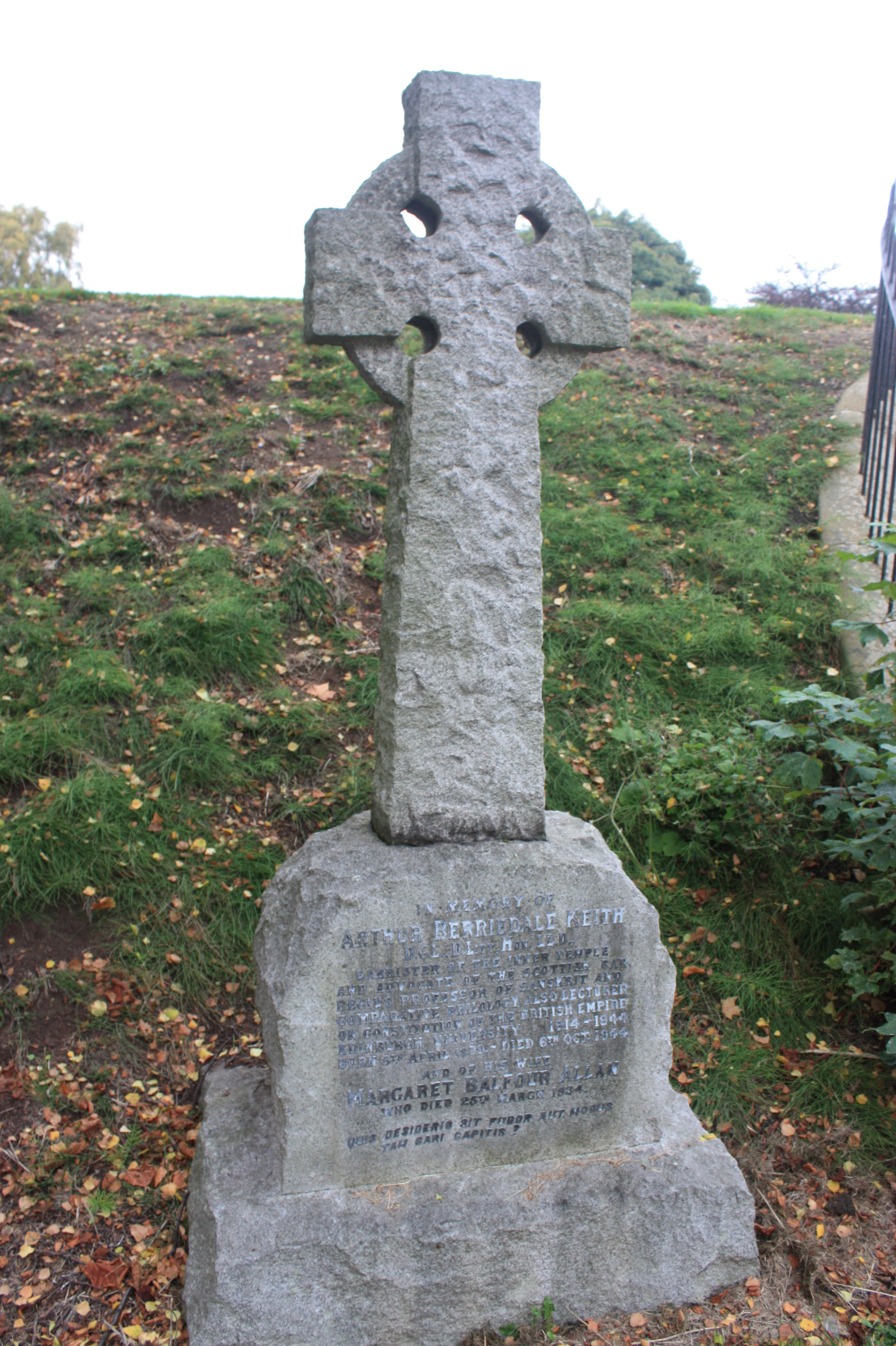
The grave of Arthur Berriedale Keith, Grange Cemetery, Edinburgh

Arthur Berriedale Keith (5 April 1879 – 6 October 1944) was a Scottish constitutional lawyer, scholar of Sanskrit and Indologist. He became Regius Professor of Sanskrit and Comparative Philology and Lecturer on the Constitution of the British Empire in the University of Edinburgh. He served in this role from 1914 to 1944.

== Biography ==
Arthur Berriedale Keith was born in Edinburgh, the fourth child and third son of Davidson Keith (1842–1921), an advertising agent, and Margaret Stobie Keith, née Drysdale (1851–1911). All his five siblings were associated with the British Empire in Burma and India: Sir William John Keith KCSI, ICS, was acting governor of Burma in 1925, R. C. Steuart Keith (1876-1919) was a sessions judge in Burma, Alan Davidson Keith (died 1928) was a barrister in Burma. Both of his sisters married British expatriates in the region.

Keith was educated at the Royal High School, Edinburgh, the University of Edinburgh (MA 1897; DLitt 1914), and Balliol College, Oxford (BA 1900; BCL 1905; DCL 1911). At Oxford he took firsts in Classical Moderations (1899), in Sanskrit and Pali (1900), and in Literae humaniores (1901). He was called to the bar by the Inner Temple in 1904 and became a member of the Faculty of Advocates in 1921.

He joined the Colonial Office as a clerk in 1901, having ranked first in the Home and Indian civil service examinations; he was said to have received the highest marks ever. He remained in the department until 1914, except for a period with the Crown Agents from 1903 to 1905. From 1912 to 1914 he was private secretary to the permanent under-secretary, Sir John Anderson.

In 1914, he became Regius Professor of Sanskrit and Comparative Philology at the University of Edinburgh. In 1927 he additionally became Lecturer on the Constitution of the British Empire.

Keith was elected an International Member of the American Philosophical Society in 1935. Keith was awarded an honorary LLD from the University of Leeds in 1936. He was elected a Fellow of the British Academy in 1935, but resigned in 1939.

He is buried in Grange Cemetery in Edinburgh with his wife, Margaret Balfour Allan (died 1934). The grave lies on the south side of the central vaults, adjacent to the central archway through the vaults.

Arthur Berriedale Keith was known for his friendship and correspondence with Albert Venn Dicey.

== Works ==
Works by or about A. Berriedale Keith at Wikisource
