= Estádio Nacional =

Stadium in Cruz Quebrada, Portugal

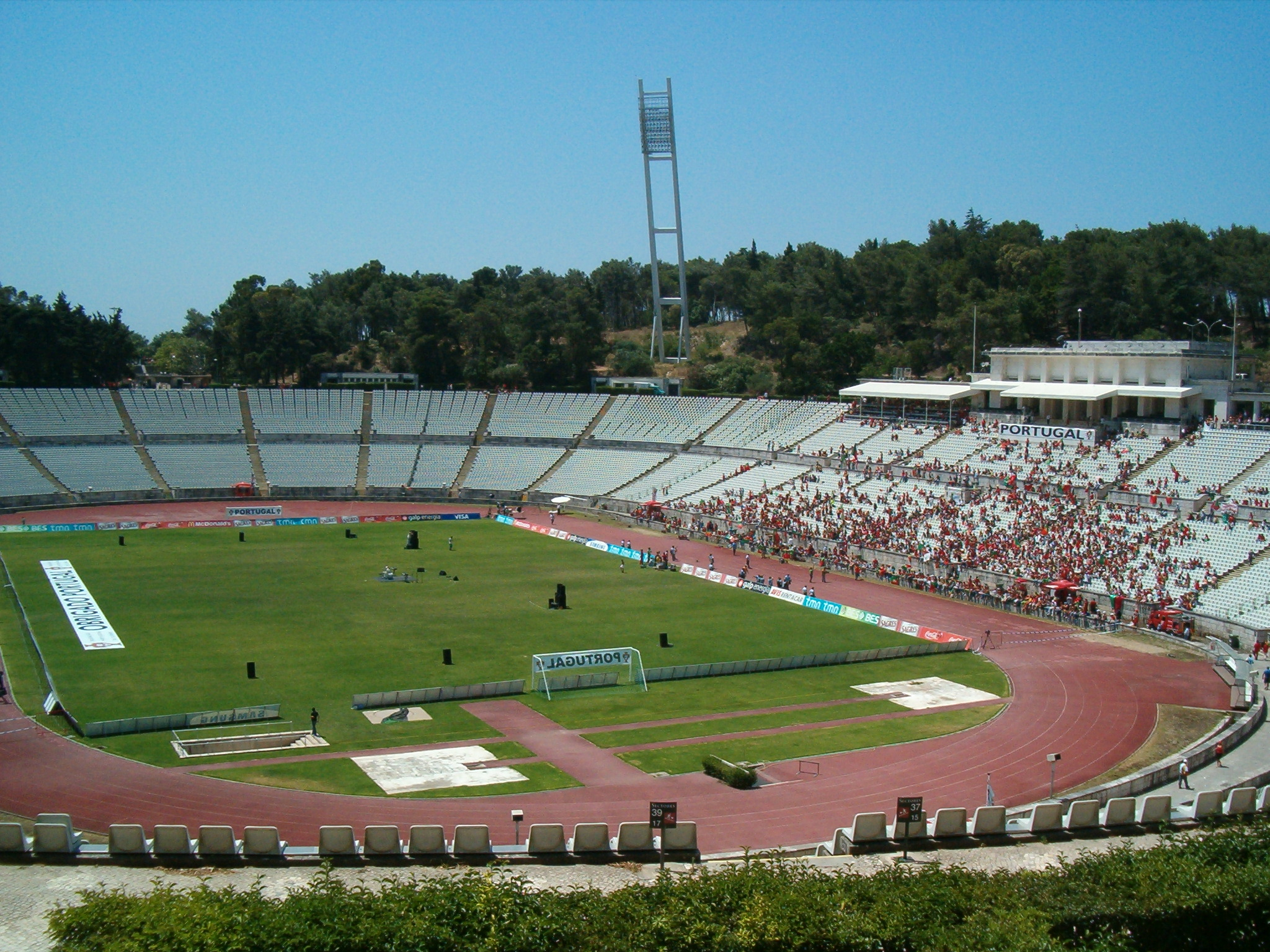
- The stadium at the reception of the National Team after the 2006 FIFA World Cup
- Interactive map of Estádio Nacional
- Full name: Estádio Nacional
- Location: Algés, Linda-a-Velha e Cruz Quebrada-Dafundo, Oeiras
- Coordinates: 38.7088°N 9.2608°W
- Owner: Portuguese Football Federation
- Capacity: 37,593
- Surface: Grass
- Field size: 105 by 68 metres (344 ft × 223 ft)

Construction
- Groundbreaking: 1939
- Opened: 10 June 1944
- Renovated: September 2012
- Architect: Miguel Jacobetty Rosa

Tenants
- Portugal national football team (selected matches); Portugal national rugby union team (selected matches); Lusitanos XV (2021–); SL Benfica (2003); B-SAD (2018–2022); Casa Pia (2022–2023)

The Estádio Nacional (English: National Stadium), also known as Estádio do Jamor, Estádio Nacional do Jamor or Estádio de Honra (English: Stadium of Honour), is a multi-purpose stadium located within the Centro Desportivo Nacional do Jamor (English: Jamor National Sports Centre). Located in the municipality of Oeiras some 12 kilometres from the centre of the national capital Lisbon, the stadium has a capacity of 37,593 spectators.

The spiritual home of Portuguese football, it has hosted the Taça de Portugal final since 1946 and the women's cup final since 2010 almost uninterrupted as well as the national team in over 50 occasions, primarily between 1945 and 1987 with sporadic matches in five other occasions since, most recently in 2026. Domestically, the venue has also been used by clubs in the absence of another ground, namely by Benfica in 2002-03, B-SAD from 2018 to 2022 and Casa Pia A.C. in 2022–23, both as a temporary home ground in the Primeira Liga.

Internationally, the stadium hosted the first ever UEFA club game on 4 September 1955 in a 3-3 tie between Primeira Divisão's third-placed team, Sporting CP, and the Yugoslav champions, Serbian side Partizan. It had previously been the stage for the 1953 Latin Cup won by French side Stade de Reims and later on repeated the duty for the 1967 European Cup Final in a match between Celtic against Inter Milan, earning the winning side the moniker of "Lisbon Lions". Aside from sports, it is occasionally used for concerts, in part due to its bowl shape.

== History ==
In 1933, the decision was made to construct the national stadium alongside the Jamor valley. The original design was authored by Francisco Caldeira Cabral and Konrad Weisner and Jacobetty Rosa, with works beginning in 1939.

It was inaugurated on 10 June 1944 (Portugal Day) by the Council president António Oliveira Salazar.

Work was complete in the Quinta da Graça (in 1953), to install the Comissão Administrativa do Estádio Nacional (National Stadium Administrative Commission).

In 1961, construction on the hippodrome began, in addition to the first phase of work on the shooting range, by the Serviços de Construção e de Conservação (Construction and Conservation Services).

The Plano de Ordenamento do Complexo Desportivo da Jamor (Jamor Sports Complex Development Plan) was issued in July 1982, ordered by the DGEMN (Direção-Geral de Edifícios e Monumentos Nacionais, in English, the Directorate-General for Buildings and National Monuments), authored by the architects Vasco Croft (coordinator), Nuno Bártolo and Joaquim Cadima, and by the landscape firm Professor Caldeira Cabral, Associados, Estudos e Projectos, Ld. (under the direction of landscape architects Francisco Caldeira Cabral and agronomist engineer João Caldeira Cabral. During this phase, diagnostic studies were performed to reformulate and re-evaluate the strategic importance of the complex.

In May 1985, the study Estabelecimento de zona de protecção (to establish a protection zone) was ordered by the DGEMN, by architects Vasco Croft and Nuno Bártolo, to limit the sports complex zone, providing a buffer for military access, a non ædificandi zone and urban growth, in addition to expansion for green spaces and support areas for nautical sports.

In 1993, a project to construct a sporting pavilion in Jamor was issued.

In September 2012, the Portuguese Football Federation announced that the stadium would undergo renovation in which work would begin in 2014.

It was announced by the Rugby governing body ERC on 2 September that the Portuguese team would hold their home games at the Estádio Nacional. However, all their home games were played at the Portuguese national rugby teams home stadium of Estádio Universitário de Lisboa.

On 6 February 2015, a tender was issued to cover the western edge of the audience seating for the rugby field.

== Architecture ==
Architecturally the stadium is noteworthy for its open east side, unusual for a stadium otherwise featuring a typical oval configuration. Its current capacity is 37,593 and it is the venue for the Portuguese football cup final.

== Sport ==
=== Football ===
See also: Taça de Portugal finals, Taça de Portugal Feminina finals

Since 1946, the stadium has traditionally hosted the final of the Portuguese Cup final; only on seven occasions has this game been played in other venues and in total, 52 Cup finals have been played on the grounds and since the 2010 so has the women's final. Cup finals at the national stadium feature a festival-like atmosphere on matchday, commonly referred to as Jamor's Party or the Cup's Party (Festa do Jamor, Festa da Taça), exhibiting family gatherings and picnics and more recently even organized events. Despite this positive attitude toward the ground, Portuguese football fans have also criticized the historic stadium due to a lack of amenities - following Euro 2004, there was a movement to move the event to one of the grounds built for the Euro football championships.

In recent years, other domestic matches have been held at the ground - after the national pyramid was restructured in 2021-22, the first two editions of the new third-tier Liga 3 featured a championship final, played at Jamor (won by Torreense and União de Leiria, respectively). The now fourth-division Campeonato de Portugal also holds its final at the venue since 2017-18, with the exception of the 2019-20 (abandoned) and 2020-21 (Coimbra) editions.

Jamor has, particularly, early on in its history, held international matches. One early example played here occurred on 3 May 1949, when Benfica won a testimonial to their captain Francisco Ferreira against Torino by 4-3 which turned out to be the last one played by the Grande Torino due to the Superga air disaster the following day. In 1953 it held a semi-final and the finals of the Latin Cup and in 1955 the inaugural European Cup match. The most prestigious international game ever staged at the Estádio Nacional, however, was the 1967 European Cup Final, played between Celtic and Internazionale with the former winning 2-1 and thus becoming the first British, Northern Europe or non-Latin team to win the European Cup/Champions League. They became known and celebrated as the Lisbon Lions and the stadium has since become a stop in Celtic fans travels to Lisbon.

In addition to hosting the Portugal national team since 1945, the site has held 50 international events for Portugal.

Match	Date	Score	Opponent	Competition
1.	11 March 1945	2–2	Spain	Friendly
2.	14 April 1946	2–1	France	Friendly
3.	16 June 1946	3–1	Republic of Ireland	Friendly
4.	5 January 1947	2–2	Switzerland	Friendly
5.	26 January 1947	4–1	Spain	Friendly
6.	25 May 1947	0–10	England	Friendly
7.	23 November 1947	2–4	France	Friendly
8.	23 May 1948	2–0	Republic of Ireland	Friendly
9.	20 March 1949	1–1	Spain	Friendly
10.	15 May 1949	3–2	Wales	Friendly
11.	9 April 1950	2–2	Spain	World Cup 1950 qualification
12.	14 May 1950	3–5	England	Friendly
13.	21 May 1950	2–2	Scotland	Friendly
14.	8 April 1951	1–4	Italy	Friendly
15.	17 June 1951	1–1	Belgium	Friendly
16.	14 December 1952	1–3	Argentina	Friendly
17.	22 November 1953	3–1	South Africa	Friendly
18.	29 November 1953	0–0	Austria	World Cup 1954 qualification
19.	28 November 1954	1–3	Argentina	Friendly
20.	19 December 1954	0–3	West Germany	Friendly
21.	20 November 1955	2–6	Sweden	Friendly
22.	25 March 1956	3–1	Turkey	Friendly
23.	8 April 1956	0–1	Brazil	Friendly
24.	3 June 1956	3–1	Spain	Friendly
25.	9 June 1956	2–2	Hungary	Friendly
26.	26 May 1957	3–0	Italy	World Cup 1958 qualification
27.	8 May 1960	2–1	Yugoslavia	Euro 1960 Quarter-finals
28.	19 March 1961	6–0	Luxembourg	World Cup 1962 qualification
29.	21 May 1961	1–1	England	World Cup 1962 qualification
30.	4 June 1961	0–2	Argentina	Friendly
31.	21 April 1963	1–0	Brazil	Friendly
32.	17 May 1964	3–4	England	Friendly
33.	24 January 1965	5–1	Turkey	World Cup 1966 qualification
34.	13 June 1965	2–1	Romania	World Cup 1966 qualification
35.	12 June 1966	4–0	Norway	Friendly
36.	26 June 1966	3–0	Uruguay	Friendly
37.	13 November 1966	1–2	Sweden	Euro 1968 qualifying
38.	17 December 1967	0–0	Bulgaria	Euro 1968 qualifying
39.	27 October 1968	3–0	Romania	World Cup 1970 qualification
40.	6 April 1969	0–0	Mexico	Friendly
41.	10 May 1970	1–2	Italy	Friendly
42.	1 November 1979	3–1	Norway	Euro 1980 qualifying
43.	2 June 1984	2–3	Yugoslavia	Friendly
44.	24 February 1985	1–2	West Germany	World Cup 1986 qualification
45.	12 October 1986	1–1	Sweden	Euro 1988 qualifying
46.	14 February 1987	0–1	Italy	Euro 1988 qualifying
47.	18 August 1999	4–0	Andorra	Friendly
48.	10 June 2003	4–0	Bolivia	Friendly
49.	31 May 2014	0–0	Greece	Friendly
50.	8 June 2024	1–2	Croatia	Friendly
51.	6 June 2026	2–1	Chile	Friendly

=== Rugby ===
The Rugby governing body ERC announced on 2 September 2014 that the Portuguese club Lusitanos XV would hold their home games of the 2013-14 Amlin Challenge Cup at National Stadium. However, all their home games of the 2013-14 Amlin Challenge Cup were played at the Portuguese national rugby teams home stadium of Estádio Universitário de Lisboa.

Since 2017, the Portuguese national rugby team has played selected matches at the Estádio Nacional. Several other matches were played at the rugby fields directly east of the ground (Campo de Treino de Râguebi/Rugby, registered in match reports as CAR Jamor) particularly in 2021 and 2022, including matches from those editions of the Rugby Europe Championship and the inaugural Rugby Europe Super Cup final, in which Lusitanos XV lost to the georgian development team, Black Lion.

Match	Date	Score	Opponent	Competition
1.	18 February 2017	35-10	Poland	2016-17 Rugby Europe Trophy
2.	11 March 2017	59-0	Moldova	2016-17 Rugby Europe Trophy
3.	18 November 2017	45-12	Czech Republic	2017-18 Rugby Europe Trophy/ 2019 Rugby World Cup Qualifiers - Europe, R4 Final
4.	4 February 2023	54-17	Belgium	2023 Rugby Europe Championship Pool B
5.	10 February 2024	54-7	Poland	2024 Rugby Europe Championship Pool B
6.	1 March 2025	31-42	Spain	2025 Rugby Europe Championship SF
7.	16 March 2025	7-21	Romania	2025 Rugby Europe Championship 3rd Place Play-off
8.	12 July 2025	7-106	Ireland	Test match (Friendly)
9.	8 November 2025	8-26	Uruguay	Test match (Friendly)
10.	15 November 2025	58-12	Hong Kong	Test match (Friendly)
11.	22 February 2026	44-7	Romania	2024 Rugby Europe Championship Pool B

== Concerts and Events ==
There have been notable concerts at the stadium, including The Police on 25 September 2007, as part of their The Police Reunion Tour and the Black Eyed Peas on 30 May 2010, during their The E.N.D. World Tour. Iron Maiden played a post-pandemic show at the stadium on 31 July 2022, on the final date of their Legacy of the Beast Tour.

Over the last few decades, Jamor has occasionally also been host to concerts and other cultural events, using it's natural bowl shape and environs to its advantage. In 1999, organisers Tournée held a three-day hard rock festival called at the stadium called T-99. Despite having several large names for the time and genre, it wasn't a commercial success and so plans for a return the following year, a "T-2000", were effectively shelved. During the 2000s The Police also gave a concert at the venue and the Black Eyed Peas gave a concert in 2010, supported the Portuguese Football Federation among others, celebrating the national team's departure to South Africa for the upcoming 2010 FIFA World Cup for which the band's hit "I Gotta Feeling" had become the squad's unofficial song for the tournament. Alongside the hip-hop lineup, due to the national nature of the concert's purpose, fado singer Ana Moura sang the national anthem before the main event.

Over a decade later, Jamor returned to music by hosting the very last VOA Heavy Rock Festival after the COVID-19 pandemic. While it had become a known name in the scene, the Vagos-based festival had come into financial pressure and had since moved to the Lisbon area in 2019 and has since been replaced in its cradle by Vagos Metal Fest from 2022 and EvilLive in Lisbon from 2023. For its final edition, it held three days of concerts at Jamor, with Bring Me The Horizon and Sabaton as headliners. Avenged Sevenfold was intended to front the first day but due to constraints regarding their tour backed out and were replaced in time by french band Gojira. Jamor held one more concert that year housing Iron Maiden's Legacy of the Beast World Tour a few weeks after the festival.

Aside major concerts, the Jamor Valley isn't a stranger to cultural events. In 1977 and 1978, the then-existing hippodrome at the complex had held PCP's second and third editions of the Avante! Festival, until they were blocked by the government in power due to a never built project. On the 24 July 1999, a human formation drew the Euro 2004 bid logo on the national pitch to promote an image of unity behind the tournament. The complex grounds have also held other cultural initiatives such as several editions of the children's Festival Panda.

Concerts held at Estádio Nacional, Jamor
Date	Artist(s)	Event
16-18 July 1999	Festival T-99 16 July: Metallica, Monster Magnet, Rollins Band, Mercyful Fate, Anger 17 July: Aerosmith, The Black Crowes, Ministry, Guano Apes, RAMP 18 July: Garbage, Stereophonics, Swell, Zucchero, Repórter Estrábico [pt]	(Three-day festival, part of headliner tours: Garage Remains the Same Tour'99, Nine Lives Tour, Version 2.0 World Tour)
3 June 2000	Sting	Brand New Day Tour [de]
25 September 2007	The Police Opening act: Fiction Plane	The Police Reunion Tour
30 May 2010	Black Eyed Peas Opening acts: Buraka Som Sistema, Nu Soul Family {i}, LMFAO, TT [pt], FunkYou2, (Ana Moura)	The E.N.D. World Tour, (support by FPF and IPDJ [pt])
30 June - 2 July 2022	VOA Heavy Rock Festival 2022 30 June: Gojira ~~(Avenged Sevenfold)~~, Megadeth, Kreator, Kvelertak, Bizarra Locomotiva 1 July: Bring Me The Horizon, Mastodon, Phil Campbell and the Bastard Sons, Crossfaith, Sylosis, Alien Weaponry 2 July: Sabaton, Rise Against, Epica, Me and That Man, The Raven Age, Deadly Apples	(Three-day festival)
31 July 2022	Iron Maiden Opening acts: Within Temptation, Airbourne	Legacy of the Beast World Tour

== See also ==
- List of football stadiums in Portugal
- Taça de Portugal

Preceded by Heysel Stadium; Brussels	European Cup; Final venue 1967	Succeeded by Wembley Stadium; London
