= Bumper (broadcasting) =

Broadcasting announcement between a program and commercial break

In broadcasting, a commercial bumper, ident bumper, or break-bumper (often shortened to bump) is a brief announcement, usually two to fifteen seconds in length that can contain a voice over, placed between a pause in the program and its commercial break, and vice versa. The host, the program announcer, or a continuity announcer states the title (if any) of the presentation, the name of the program, and the broadcast or cable network, though not necessarily in that order. On children's television networks, they are sometimes called external eyecatches due to the resemblance of internal eyecatches in anime and there is usually no voice over, but some bumpers do feature one. Bumper music, often a recurring signature or theme music segment, is nearly always featured. Bumpers can vary from simple text to short films.

== United States ==
Since 1976, most network television programs in the United States no longer use commercial bumpers; although some soap operas such as Days of Our Lives (which stopped using one in 2010) and The Young and the Restless, as well as the game show The Price Is Right, still feature mid-show bumpers. Commercial bumpers are still a common feature of radio. In radio, they are often used during sports broadcasts to ease the transition from play by play to commercial break and back to live action, as well as notify local stations that they should insert their station identification and/or commercials, many times using obscure musical selections of the board operator's choosing. One example of commercial bumpers still in use can be found on Cartoon Network's late night programming block, Adult Swim, whose extensive usage of bumpers has even spawned its own website. Another example of commercial bumpers in radio would be their use in syndicated programming; for instance, the radio countdown programs American Top 40 and American Country Countdown feature a series of pre-recorded jingles and other outcues to transition to and from commercial breaks.

During the late 1970s and early 1980s, in accordance with then-current regulations set by the Federal Communications Commission that required a distinction between programs and commercials, most children's programming bumpers would include the phrase "We'll be [right] back after these messages" (or variations of it), except for the bump before the final commercial break, which would usually say, "And now, these messages" (or variations of this phrase). The FCC significantly relaxed these rules in 1984, although to this day some networks still air these bumpers, particularly during programming that airs Sunday nights at 7 pm/6 pm Central that is not a news or information program such as 60 Minutes. Another common bumper phrase was "And now, a word from our sponsor."

Bumpers also had a technical reason for existence: Early videotape machines took several seconds to start playing video in proper synchronization with the program source. The board operator would cue the tape with a "preroll" of several seconds then use the start of the bumper as a signal to start the tape before "taking" it at the bumper's end. In the event of a glitch, the bumper was neither commercial nor programming content, and money would not be lost by the network or broadcaster.

== United Kingdom ==
In the United Kingdom, a break-bumper is a brief appearance of a logo before and after advertising breaks, usually that of the television channel being watched.

Break-bumpers can either be animated or static. They are sometimes branded to advertise a special programme or event that will be broadcast on that channel, such as sporting events.

Historically, break-bumpers within a programme were tied to the programme itself, often featuring an image from the show, a short extract from the show's theme tune, and a caption naming the show and containing words such as "End of Part 1" (at the start of a break) or "Part 2" (at the end of a break). Some channels will also include a secondary bumper, which appears between channel trailers (which usually book-end ad breaks) and the commercial adverts themselves. E4 from launch and for a long time afterwards would use each of these to display the appropriate half of a two-word phrase.

== Australia ==
In Australia, a break-bumper can be a brief appearance of a programme logo, animated logo, title card or an animated title card, just before an advertising break.

Break-bumpers can also be either animated or static information bars that appear for a few seconds, with program title and the logo of the television channel being watched. These are more often seen after a break and sometimes followed by information bars that show what programme is coming next or later.

== Japan ==
In Japan, an eyecatch (アイキャッチ, aikyatchi) or internal eyecatch is a short scene or illustration used to begin and end a commercial break in a television program, especially in anime and tokusatsu shows. The term is used, in Japan, to refer to all kinds of bumpers.

Eyecatches often come at the climax of a story to stimulate viewer anticipation during the commercial break.

Unlike in American programs, in which bumpers are typically supplied by the network (when they have them at all), eyecatches are almost always produced by the production company and considered a part of the program itself, rather than (or also serving as) a segue into a commercial break. They are typically two to six seconds in length. Eyecatches for children's programs are often longer and more elaborate, while eyecatches for programming intended for adults may consist of nothing more than the program's logo against a black background.

The term is used in the title of the 1991 Japanese film Eyecatch Junction.

== Malaysia ==
In the 1990s, commercial bumpers were used by terrestrial television networks. Similar to those in the United Kingdom, it is a short appearance of a logo or a slide to remind the viewers of the programme being aired, which appears before or after breaks. The logo is usually that of the television channel or station being watched and/or of the programme's title. However, as the years passed on until the late 2000s, this changed to feature a message that the programme will return after the break ends, which is now more commonly seen on RTM's TV1 and TV2 and Media Prima's NTV7, 8TV and TV9. TV3 also uses this for sponsored programmes, but as of 2013, it also uses them for non-sponsored programs, such as children's programmes. The 1990s bumper style, however, is sometimes used sparingly.

Since 2003, nearly all of Astro's satellite television channels feature break bumpers that are placed before and after breaks. These bumpers consist of the logo of the aforementioned channels, as well as a slide promoting the current programme being broadcast and the next programme scheduled to air. Bumpers based on the subscription information sequence seen at the end of Astro Box Office promotional trailers from 2003 to 2006, appear in-between commercials and immediately before the program break ends, but not at the beginning of the block of replaced commercials.

== Philippines ==
In the Philippines, one notable example of a television network that use break bumpers is ABS-CBN. From March 1, 1987, to October 30, 2005, its break bumper featured the stars zooming in on a black background, based on the Star Network era. This was the longest break bumper to be used by the network since its relaunch in 1986, being used for 18 years. It was made by Scanimate, as Cascom Effect 10. On its last two years of usage from 2003 to October 2005, it was extended where after the first loop, the star fades and repeats an animation before it ends.

On October 31, 2005, five years after the 2000 ABS-CBN logo was unveiled, the 1987 break bumper was replaced with the one that takes place on a blue background, with the network's 1999 logo appearing on a screen and when it zooms out, it places on a box or crystal plane and then the logo zooms in, based on its ident in 2004. The 2005 break bumper was used until February 4, 2014.

The break bumper again changed on February 5, 2014, due to the 2013 logo that was first used on September 9, 2013, this time taking place on a white background, with the 2013 ABS-CBN logo appearing on a screen, red, green and blue strings representing the colors of the network's logo appear while the logo is being zoomed out, and it zooms in. It lasted on ABS-CBN free television channels from February 2014 to the shutdown of ABS-CBN Regional channels on August 28, 2020. From June 13, 2016, to August 28, 2020, the 2014 bumper is shown in widescreen or letterboxed format, making the first break bumper to be in 16:9 aspect ratio. It returned three years later in 2023 on Kapamilya Online Live as one of the montages of its bumper.

Kapamilya Channel, replacement of the ABS-CBN terrestrial network, show the 2013 logo on the screen and colors it with red, green, blue, and black. The rings will then zoom in, and the Kapamilya Channel logo will display and replace the ABS-CBN logo. ABS-CBN rings will then use as background once the Kapamilya Channel logo appears and the logo will zoom in along with the rings.

Since April 17, 2022, A2Z, ABS-CBN's blocktime channel with ZOE Broadcasting Network, have also its own break bumper. It shows the A2Z logo forming animation where it stays on the screen and zooms in on a right-slant fashion, similar to Kapamilya Channel. It shows on programs, whether ABS-CBN produced or not, if a channel is connected to the main ABS-CBN/Kapamilya Channel broadcast feed with the latter's bumper simply replaced with A2Z's own.

Upon the start of airing of ABS-CBN programming on TV5 on January 24, 2021, show-exclusive break bumpers of ABS-CBN Entertainment/Studios were introduced where either the respective show's characters, elements related to the show and parts of the show's logo are shown during the duration of the bumper or simply show both logos upon airing of the show-exclusive bumper. At the end of each bumper, either all of the two or simply the logo of a show appears and after they appear, an object related to the show, show's logo, or logo of the show and its characters zoom in on various angles with some on a straightforward manner like the 2014–2020 break bumper of ABS-CBN terrestrial network. Break bumpers of foreign television series, some programs, and programming blocks do not have the distributor logo above. This also applies on A2Z if it is not connected to main blocktimer feed from April 2022 and GMA Network since April 6, 2024. This lasted on TV5 until January 1, 2026.

When the entirety of Kapamilya Channel simulcasted on All TV from January 2, 2026, its break bumper has a red, green, blue, yellow, and orange circle, a combination of ABS-CBN and All TV colors, on a white background. The circles appear (in a similar manner to Cartoon Network Productions Cartoon Cartoons ripple endtag from November 12, 1999, to April 24, 2018, albeit without music) using the said colors where a circle zooms in, the words "Kapamilya" and "Channel" slides in forming its logo and rotates in a 180 degrees sliding away from the screen where "sa (AllTV2 logo)" is then shown. Circles again ripple where the finished product of the logo is shown (Kapamilya Channel sa AllTV2). Background and logo animates and then they zoom in on a straightforward fashion where the circles ripple for the last time, with some are red, green, blue, and red which are ABS-CBN's colors.

From March 1, 1987, to August 28, 2020, they lasted for 2 seconds. It extended at 5 seconds starting with the Kapamilya Channel break bumper since June 13, 2020 and applies to further bumpers made after that.

They always originally followed after the product placements and before the first TV network ad signalled that program resume is near from March 1987 to August 2014 for ABS-CBN broadcast. Due to the modernization of its broadcast facilities in the 2010s, the format of having the bumper and TV network ads shown first after the title card marking a pause to the program before proceeding to product ones leading to its resume was implemented at the said month of 2014. It is also used on its successor Kapamilya Channel. However, the older 1987 format is still used occasionally by the network itself until late 2010s, TV5, and A2Z if not connected to the ABS-CBN feed. All of them have no music played at all or silent. Bumpers made since October 31, 2005 with the 2005–2014 are all made ABS-CBN Creative Communications Management (CCM), the network's in-house design agency responsible for the bumpers, promos, and their animations.

== Poland ==
In Poland, television networks usually separate the rest of the programming with the word "Reklama" ("Commercial"). One of the examples are TVP's ones: First one was used since 1989 until 1990 and it consisted an ad agency's logo (eye in a form of letter S) in a black background with indigo 3D stars. Second one was used until 1992, which consisted newer ad agency logo (Loop in a form of during this time acronym (TP) with a ball) and a word "REKLAMA" in lower left corner in a black (until 1991 blue) background. Third one was used in early 1992 and it was a laser smashing a metal ball, in which later rotating 'REKLAMA' appears and in the same year, later version appeared, in which squares (or diagonal stripes, depending on channel) rotated the same word (and the same font) as previous. This one was used until launch of 1995 one (Inspired by gyroscope), in which was used until 1997. Later, in the late 1990s, these bumpers were used, depending on era, but had one thing: word in a ball (except July–August 1999, in which a "Meandres" series was used).

Since 2000 (except 2012–2015, when a kaleidoscope‑inspired design was used on both channels), the graphics have been separated. TVP1 has used newer graphic technologies since 2010, and TVP2 since 2007. Previously, both channels used designs inspired by art (TVP1 from 2000 to 2010 and TVP2 from 2000 to 2007) or by real‑life imagery. TVP1 introduced two such bumpers: the first used briefly in 2010, and the second used until 2012. TVP2 also used similar bumpers during this period, with seasonal color variations—blue in winter, purple in other seasons, and orange. The same technique returned in the 2015–2021 branding, but expanded to all colors.

Polsat, the first commercial TV Channel in Poland, used the following bumpers:

1992-1994: Rotating spiral from Polsat's 1992 logo with REKLAMA text under it.

1994-1996: Rotating stripes forming a background and, appearing later, REKLAMA text. There were two variants: Blue-silver and pink-gold.

1996-1998: The sun emerges partially (upper part seen) from golden liquid and REKLAMA text (blue, with Arial font) appears on the lower right corner. On the end of ad break, it's the reversed situation.

1998 Easter: A chick runs on blue background, forming REKLAMA text. At the end of block, chick returns to previous place, removing colo(u)rful text.

1998-2001: "reklama" text repeated thrice, each one in different size, on white-indigo background.

== In other countries ==
In Argentina, since around September 2010, it is compulsory for almost all broadcasters to use a commercial bumper, using the words "Espacio publicitario" (Commercial break) to separate the rest of the programme from the advertisements.

In Indonesia, bumpers are uncommon, but channels known to have bumpers included the Indonesian branch of Spacetoon (with the texts KAMI AKAN KEMBALI "we will return" before and KAMI KEMBALI "we returned" after breaks), and now defunct Lampung TV (used after breaks and used in 2008, featuring its mascot Mr. eL). In Malay, "kami akan kembali" and "kami kembali" also mean the same thing in Indonesian. Other idents called "bumpers", are in fact, only used before and/or after the Maghrib and Subuh (Fajr) adhan, (Note: Depending on its location, majority of regions outside Jakarta only aired the Maghrib adhan in local time (via UHF), when channels from Emtek broadcast both Maghrib and Subuh adhan. In Aceh, all television channels aired five times adhan, while in Bali, only broadcast Trisandya at a certain time.) of which may be replaced by commercial breaks and TV show promos, PSA outside the Jakarta feed, and not used elsewhere. (Note: Several channels such as Trans TV, Trans7, Kompas TV only replaced by promos in UHF outside Jakarta via local bureau, and both Maghrib and Subuh adhan still be witnessed in satellite.) From 1993 to the unknown date, when RCTI and SCTV begin its national on-air, both of the television stations randomly displaying the still image of regional relay transmission station and its iconic regional symbol of its region, or its still image ident.

In German-speaking countries, the word "Werbung" (Advertisement) is used; in Switzerland, this word is also used in different languages: French: Publicité or Pub in short; Italian: Pubblicità. The same goes for France and Italy, but only second and third ones are written, respectively.

== Bumpers on children's television ==
Bumpers or external eyecatches on children's television networks, and sometimes other networks, are similar to the internal eyecatches used in Japanese anime, with the difference being that the bumpers are supplied by the network. These usually appear only at the end of commercial breaks, but sometimes leading into the start of the break as well. Their primary purpose is to alert children that the commercial break has ended. Depending on the network, the bumper may or may not feature a voice over.

Often, these eyecatches have a secondary purpose: marketing. For example, cable network Nickelodeon uses them to help children learn to identify the network and thus increase brand awareness. Most children's television networks run these bumpers because of this reason. From the mid-1980s to the early 1990s periods, (in conjunction with branding firm Fred/Alan, Inc.), the network created 225 bumpers, some featuring catchy doo-wop jingles recorded by a cappella group The Jive Five.

== See also ==
- Promo (media)
