= Gayatri Mantra =

Mantra of the Vedic tradition

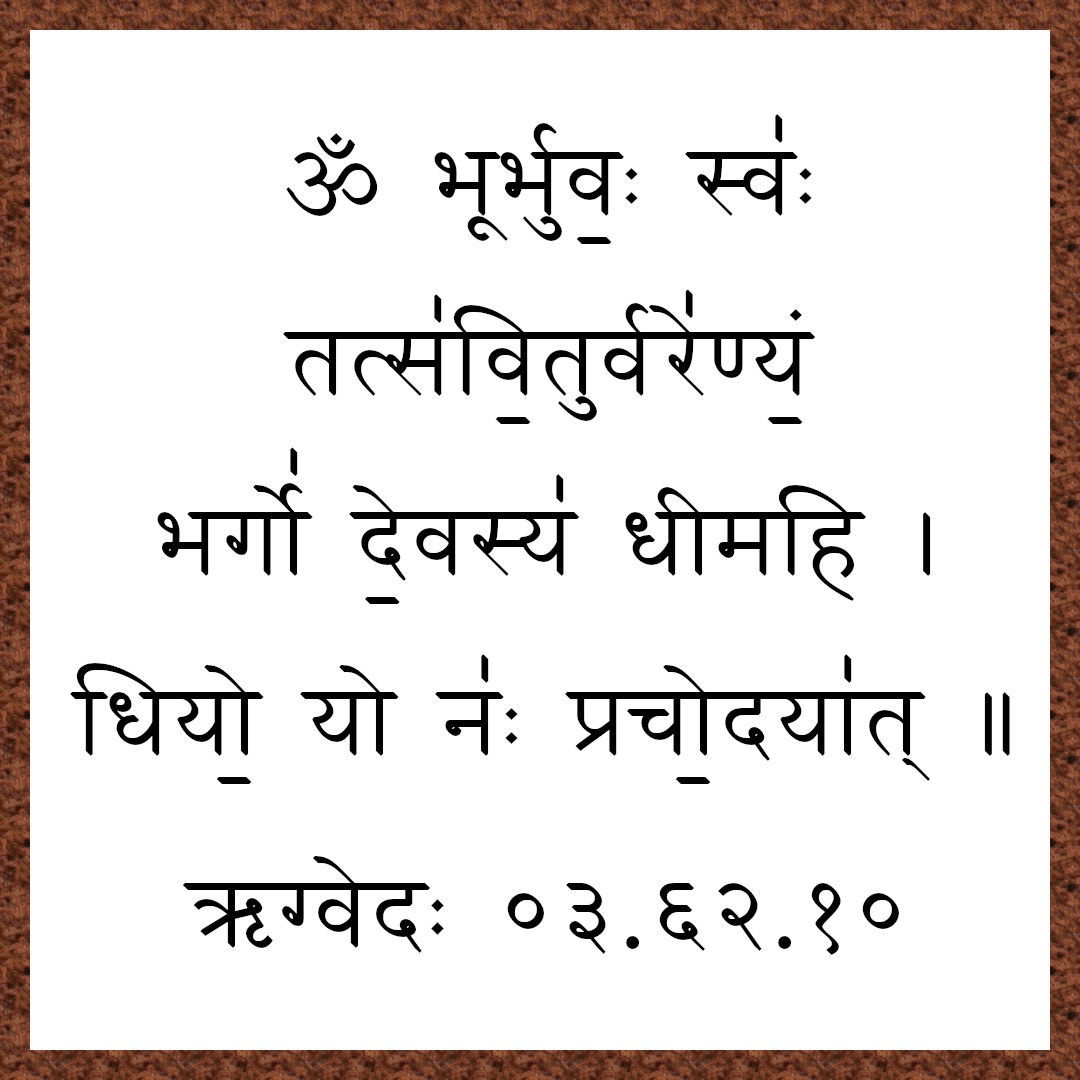
Gāyatrī Mantra in the Devanāgarī script, with symbols for Vedic pitch accent

Recitation of the Gayatri mantra. Duration: 23 seconds.

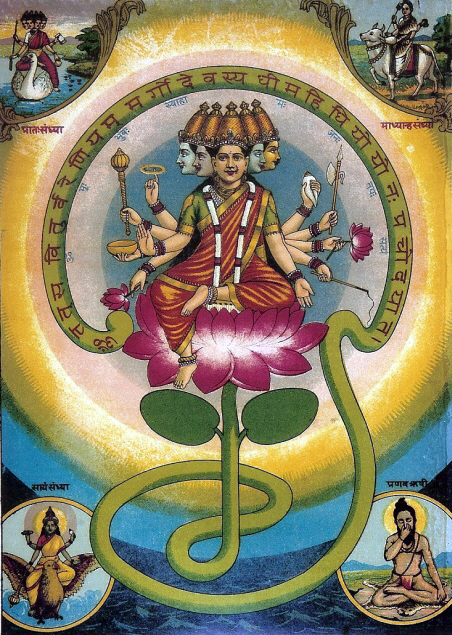
Gayatri Mantra personified as the goddess Gayatri, surrounded by the Tamil Om symbol, with the mantra written in it. From left clockwise: Brahmi as Pratah Sandhya (Morning), Maheshwari as Madhyanika Sandhya (Afternoon), Pranava Rishi and Vaishnavi as Sayam Sandhya (Evening).

The Gāyatrī Mantra (Sanskrit pronunciation: [ɡaː.jɐ.triː.mɐn.trɐ.]), also known as the Sāvitrī Mantra (Sanskrit: सावित्रीमन्त्र), is a sacred mantra from the Ṛig Veda (Mandala 3.62.10), dedicated to the Vedic deity Savitr. The mantra is attributed to the brahmarshi Vishvamitra.

The term Gāyatrī may also refer to a type of mantra which follows the same Vedic metre as the original Gāyatrī Mantra (without the first line). There are many such Gāyatrīs for various gods and goddesses. Furthermore, Gāyatrī is the name of the Goddess of the mantra and the meter.

The Gayatri mantra is cited widely in Hindu texts, such as the mantra listings of the Śrauta liturgy, and classical Hindu texts such as the Bhagavad Gita, Harivamsa, and Manusmṛti. The mantra and its associated metric form was known by the Buddha. The mantra is an important part of the initiation ceremony. Modern Hindu reform movements spread the practice of the mantra to everyone and its use is now very widespread.

== Dedication ==
The Gāyatrī mantra is dedicated to Savitr, a solar deity. The mantra is attributed to the much revered sage Viśvāmitra, who is also considered the author of Mandala 3 of the Rigveda.

== Text ==
The main mantra appears in the hymn RV 3.62.10. During its recitation, the hymn is preceded by oṃ (ॐ) and the formula bhūr bhuvaḥ svaḥ (भूर् भुवः स्वः), known as the mahāvyāhṛti, or "great (mystical) utterance". This prefixing of the mantra is properly described in the Taittiriya Aranyaka (2.11.1-8), which states that it should be chanted with the syllable oṃ, followed by the three Vyahrtis and the Gayatri verse.

Whereas in principle the gāyatrī mantra specifies three pādas of eight syllables each, the text of the verse as preserved in the Samhita is one short, seven instead of eight. Metrical restoration would emend the attested tri-syllabic vareṇyaṃ with a tetra-syllabic vareṇiyaṃ.

The Gayatri mantra with svaras:

Devanagari

ॐ भूर्भुव॒: स्व॒:
तत्स॑वि॒तुर्वरे॑ण्यं॒
भर्गो॑ दे॒वस्य॑ धीमहि।
धियो॒ यो न॑: प्रचो॒दया॑त्॥

IAST

oṃ bhūrbhuva̱: sva̱:
tatsa̍vi̱turvare̍ṇya̱ṃ
bhargo̍ de̱vasya̍ dhīmahi.
dhiyo̱ yo na̍: praco̱dayā̍t.

Gloss

tat savituḥ vareṇyam bhargaḥ devasya dhīmahi dhiyaḥ yaḥ naḥ pra-codayāt
that Savitr-GEN lovely-ACC splendor-ACC god-GEN may-we-attain thoughts-ACC who-NOM our may-he-guide
'May we attain that lovely splendor of the God Savitā, who may guide our thoughts.'

== Translations ==
The Gayatri mantra has been translated in many ways. Quite literal translations include:

- Swami Vivekananda: "We meditate on the glory of that Being who has produced this universe; may He enlighten our minds."
- Monier Monier-Williams (1882): "Let us meditate on that excellent glory of the divine vivifying Sun, May he enlighten our understandings."
- Ralph T.H. Griffith (1896): "May we attain that excellent glory of Savitar the god: So may He stimulate our prayers."
- S. Radhakrishnan:

- (1947): "We meditate on the effulgent glory of the divine Light; may he inspire our understanding."
- (1953): "We meditate on the adorable glory of the radiant sun; may She inspire our intelligence."

- Sri Aurobindo: "We choose the Supreme Light of the divine Sun; we aspire that it may impel our minds." Sri Aurobindo further elaborates: "The Sun is the symbol of divine Light that is coming down and Gayatri gives expression to the aspiration asking that divine Light to come down and give impulsion to all the activities of the mind."
- Stephanie W. Jamison and Joel P. Brereton: "Might we make our own that desirable effulgence of god Savitar, who will rouse forth our insights."

More interpretative translations include:

- Sir John Woodroffe (Arthur Avalon) (1913): "Om. Let us contemplate the wondrous spirit of the Divine Creator (Savitri) of the earthly, atmospheric, and celestial spheres. May He direct our minds (that is, 'towards' the attainment of dharmma, artha, kama, and moksha), Om."
- Ravi Shankar (poet): "Oh manifest and unmanifest, wave and ray of breath, red lotus of insight, transfix us from eye to navel to throat, under canopy of stars spring from soil in an unbroken arc of light that we might immerse ourselves until lit from within like the sun itself."
- Pandit Shriram Sharma: Om, the Brahm, the Universal Divine Energy, vital spiritual energy (Pran), the essence of our life existence, Positivity, destroyer of sufferings, the happiness, that is bright, luminous like the Sun, best, destroyer of evil thoughts, the divinity who grants happiness may imbibe its Divinity and Brilliance within us which may purify us and guide our righteous wisdom on the right path.
- Sir William Jones (1807): "Let us adore the supremacy of that divine sun, the god-head who illuminates all, who recreates all, from whom all proceed, to whom all must return, whom we invoke to direct our understandings right in our progress toward his holy seat."
- William Quan Judge (1893): "Unveil, O Thou who givest sustenance to the Universe, from whom all proceed, to whom all must return, that face of the True Sun now hidden by a vase of golden light, that we may see the truth and do our whole duty on our journey to thy sacred seat."
- Sivanath Sastri (Brahmo Samaj) (1911): "We meditate on the worshipable power and glory of Him who has created the earth, the nether world and the heavens (i.e. the universe), and who directs our understanding." (Note: The word Savitr in the original Sanskrit may be interpreted in two ways, first as the sun, secondly as the "originator or creator". Raja Ram Mohan Roy and Maharshi Debendranath Tagore used that word in the second sense. Interpreted in their way the whole formula may be thus rendered.)
- Swami Sivananda: "Let us meditate on Isvara and His Glory who has created the Universe, who is fit to be worshipped, who is the remover of all sins and ignorance. May he enlighten our intellect."
- Dayananda Saraswati (founder of Arya Samaj): "Oh God! Thou art the Giver of Life, Remover of pain and sorrow, The Bestower of happiness. Oh! Creator of the Universe, May we receive thy supreme sin-destroying light, May Thou guide our intellect in the right direction."
- Kirpal Singh: "Muttering the sacred syllable 'Aum' rise above the three regions, And turn thy attention to the All-Absorbing Sun within. Accepting its influence be thou absorbed in the Sun, And it shall in its own likeness make thee All-Luminous."

=== Syllables of the Gayatri mantra ===
Gayatri mantra, called Gayatri Chandas in Sanskrit, is twenty-four syllables comprising three lines (Sk. padas, literally "feet") of eight syllables each, in this case starting from tat savitur vareṇyaṃ. The first line, oṃ bhūr bhuvaḥ svaḥ, is not part of the gayatri syllables, but an introduction to invoke the mantra to work on three Vyāhṛti or planes (physical, mental and spiritual).

The Gayatri mantra as received is short one syllable in the first line: tat sa vi tur va reṇ yaṃ. Being only twenty-three syllables the Gayatri mantra is Nichruth Gayatri Chandas ("Gayatri mantra short by one syllable"). A reconstruction of vareṇyaṃ to a proposed historical vareṇiyaṃ restores the first line to eight syllables. In practise, people reciting the mantra may retain seven syllables and simply prolong the length of time they pronounce the "m", they may append an extra syllable of "mmm" (approximately va-ren-yam-mmm), or they may use the reconstructed vareṇiyaṃ.

== Textual appearances ==
=== Hindu literature ===
The Gayatri mantra is cited widely in Hindu texts, such as the mantra listings of the Śrauta liturgy, (Note: Sama Veda: 2.812; Vajasenayi Samhita (M): 3.35, 22.9, 30.2, 36.3; Taittiriya Samhita: 1.5.6.4, 1.5.8.4, 4.1.11.1; Maitrayani Samhita: 4.10.3; Taittiriya Aranyaka: 1.11.2) (Note: Where it is used without any special distinction, typically as one among several stanzas dedicated to Savitar at appropriate points in the various rituals.) and cited several times in the Brahmanams and the Srauta-sutras. (Note: Aitareya Brahmana: 4.32.2, 5.5.6, 5.13.8, 5.19.8; Kausitaki Brahmana: 23.3, 26.10; Asvalayana Srautasutra: 7.6.6, 8.1.18; Shankhayana Srautasutra: 2.10.2, 2.12.7, 5.5.2, 10.6.17, 10.9.16; Apastambha Srautasutra: 6.18.1) (Note: In this corpus, there is only one instance of the stanza being prefixed with the three mahavyahrtis. This is in a late supplementary chapter of the Shukla Yajurveda samhita, listing the mantras used in the preliminaries to the pravargya ceremony. However, none of the parallel texts of the pravargya rite in other samhitas have the stanza at all. A form of the mantra with all seven vyahrtis prefixed is found in the last book of the Taittiriya Aranyaka, better known as the Mahanarayana Upanishad. It is as follows: ओम् भूः ओम् भुवः ओम् सुवः ओम् महः ओम् जनः ओम् तपः ओम् स॒त्यम्। ओम् तत्स॑वि॒तुर्वरे॑ण्य॒म् भर्गो॑ दे॒वस्य॑ धीमहि। धियो॒ यो नः॑ प्रचो॒दया॑त्। ओमापो॒ ज्योती॒ रसो॒ऽमृतं॒ ब्रह्म॒ भूर्भुव॒स्सुव॒रोम्।) It is also cited in a number of grhyasutras, mostly in connection with the upanayana ceremony in which it has a significant role.

The Gayatri mantra is the subject of esoteric treatment and explanation in some major Upanishads, including Mukhya Upanishads such as the Brihadaranyaka Upanishad, (Note: 6.3.6 in the well-known Kanva recension, numbered 6.3.11-13 in the Madhyamdina recension.) the Shvetashvatara Upanishad and the Maitrayaniya Upanishad; (Note: 6.7, 6.34, albeit in a section known to be of late origin.) as well as other well-known works such as the Jaiminiya Upanishad Brahmana. The text also appears in minor Upanishads, such as the Surya Upanishad.

The Gayatri mantra is the apparent inspiration for derivative "gāyatrī" stanzas dedicated to other deities. Those derivations are patterned on the formula vidmahe - dhīmahi - pracodayāt", and have been interpolated into some recensions of the Shatarudriya litany. (Note: Maitrayani Samhita: 2.9.1; Kathaka Samhita: 17.11) Gāyatrīs of this form are also found in the Mahanarayana Upanishad. (Note: Taittiriya Aranyaka: 10.1.5-7)

The Gayatri mantra is also repeated and cited widely in Hindu texts such as the Mahabharata, Harivamsa, and Manusmṛti.

=== Buddhist corpus ===
In Majjhima Nikaya 92, the Buddha refers to the Sāvitri (Pali: sāvittī) mantra as the foremost meter, in the same sense as the king is foremost among humans, or the sun is foremost among lights:

aggihuttamukhā yaññā sāvittī chandaso mukham; Rājā mukhaṃ manussānaṃ, nadīnaṃ sāgaro mukhaṃ. Nakkhattānaṃ mukhaṃ cando, ādicco tapataṃ mukhaṃ; Puññaṃ ākaṅkhamānānaṃ, saṅgho ve yajataṃ mukhan.

The foremost of sacrifices is offering to the sacred flame; the Sāvittī is the foremost of poetic meters; of humans, the king is the foremost; the ocean’s the foremost of rivers; the foremost of stars is the moon; the sun is the foremost of lights; for those who sacrifice seeking merit,

the Saṅgha is the foremost.

In Sutta Nipata 3.4, the Buddha uses the Sāvitri mantra as a paradigmatic indicator of Brahmanic knowledge:

Brāhmaṇo hi ce tvaṃ brūsi, Mañca brūsi abrāhmaṇaṃ; Taṃ taṃ sāvittiṃ pucchāmi, Tipadaṃ catuvīsatakkharaṃ

If you say you brahmin are, but call me none, then of you I ask the chant of Sāvitrī, consisting of three lines

in four and twenty syllables.

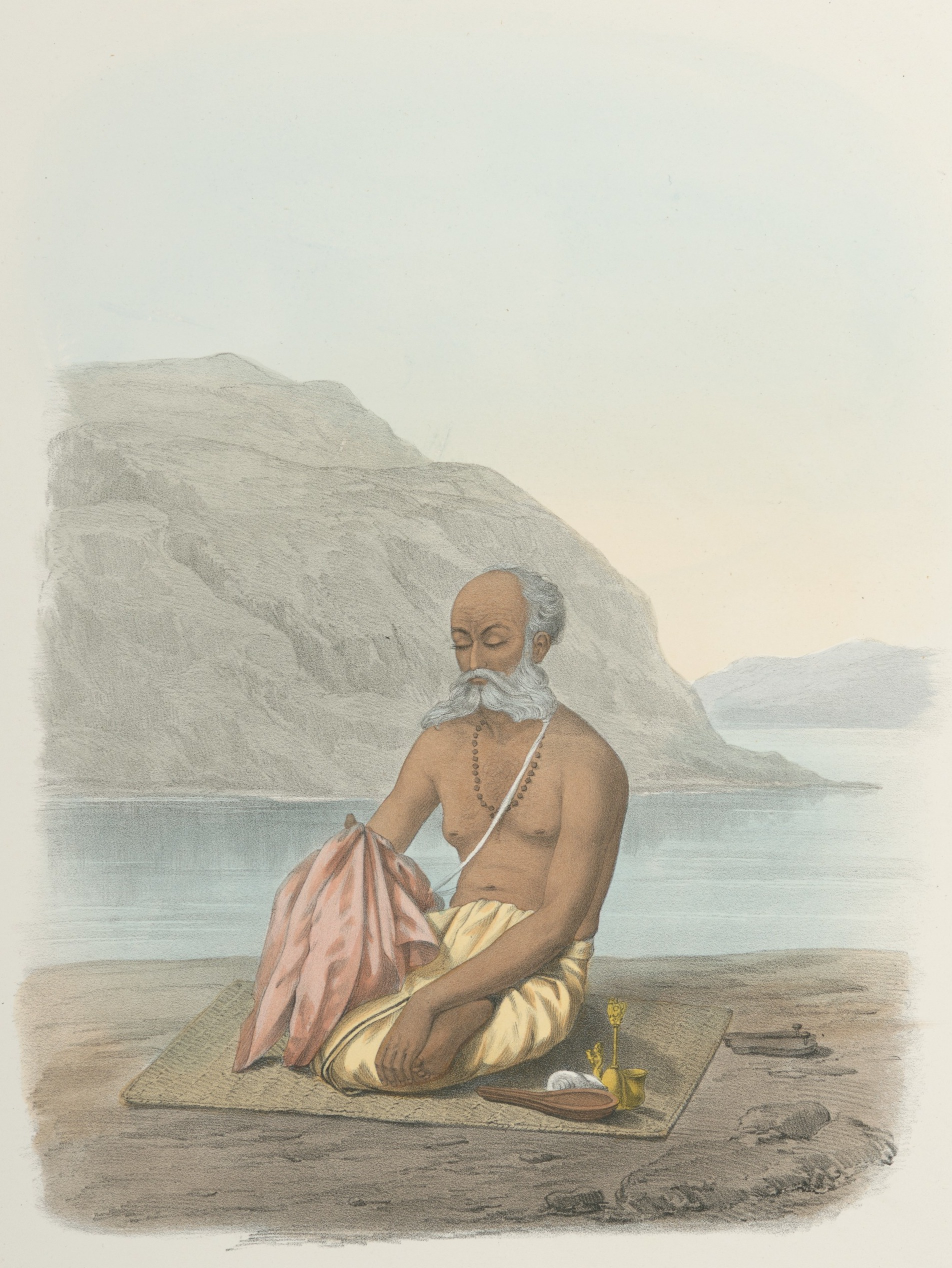
Gayatri Japa, 1851 lithograph

=== Upanayana ceremony ===
Imparting the Gayatri mantra to young Hindu men is an important part of the traditional upanayana ceremony, which marks the beginning of study of the Vedas. Sarvepalli Radhakrishnan described this as the essence of the ceremony, which is sometimes called "Gayatri diksha", i.e. initiation into the Gayatri mantra. However, traditionally, the stanza RV.3.62.10 is imparted only to Brahmana. Other Gayatri verses are used in the upanayana ceremony are: RV.1.35.2, in the tristubh meter, for a kshatriya and either RV.1.35.9 or RV.4.40.5 in the jagati meter for a Vaishya.

=== Mantra-recitation ===
Gayatri japa is used as a method of prāyaścitta (atonement). It is believed by practitioners that reciting the mantra bestows wisdom and enlightenment, through the vehicle of the Sun (Savitr), who represents the source and inspiration of the universe.

=== Brahmo Samaj ===
In 1827 Ram Mohan Roy published a dissertation on the Gayatri mantra that analysed it in the context of various Upanishads. Roy prescribed a Brahmin to always pronounce om at the beginning and end of the Gayatri mantra. From 1830, the Gayatri mantra was used for private devotion of Brahmos. In 1843, the First Covenant of Brahmo Samaj required the Gayatri mantra for Divine Worship. From 1848 to 1850 with the rejection of Vedas, the Adi Dharma Brahmins use the Gayatri mantra in their private devotions.

=== Hindu revivalism ===
In the later 19th century, Hindu reform movements spread the chanting of the Gayatri mantra. In 1898 for example, Swami Vivekananda claimed that, according to the Vedas and the Bhagavad Gita, a person became Brahmana through learning from his Guru, and not because of birth. He administered the Gayatri mantra to non-Brahmins in Ramakrishna Mission. This Hindu mantra has been popularized to the masses, pendants, audio recordings and mock scrolls. Various Gayatri yajñas organised by All World Gayatri Pariwar at small and large scales in late twentieth century also helped spread Gayatri mantra to the masses.

=== Indonesian Hinduism ===
The Gayatri Mantra forms the first of seven sections of the Trisandhyā Puja (Sanskrit for "three divisions"), a prayer used by the Balinese Hindus and many Hindus in Indonesia. It is uttered three times each day: 6 am at morning, noon, and 6 pm at evening.

== Popular culture ==
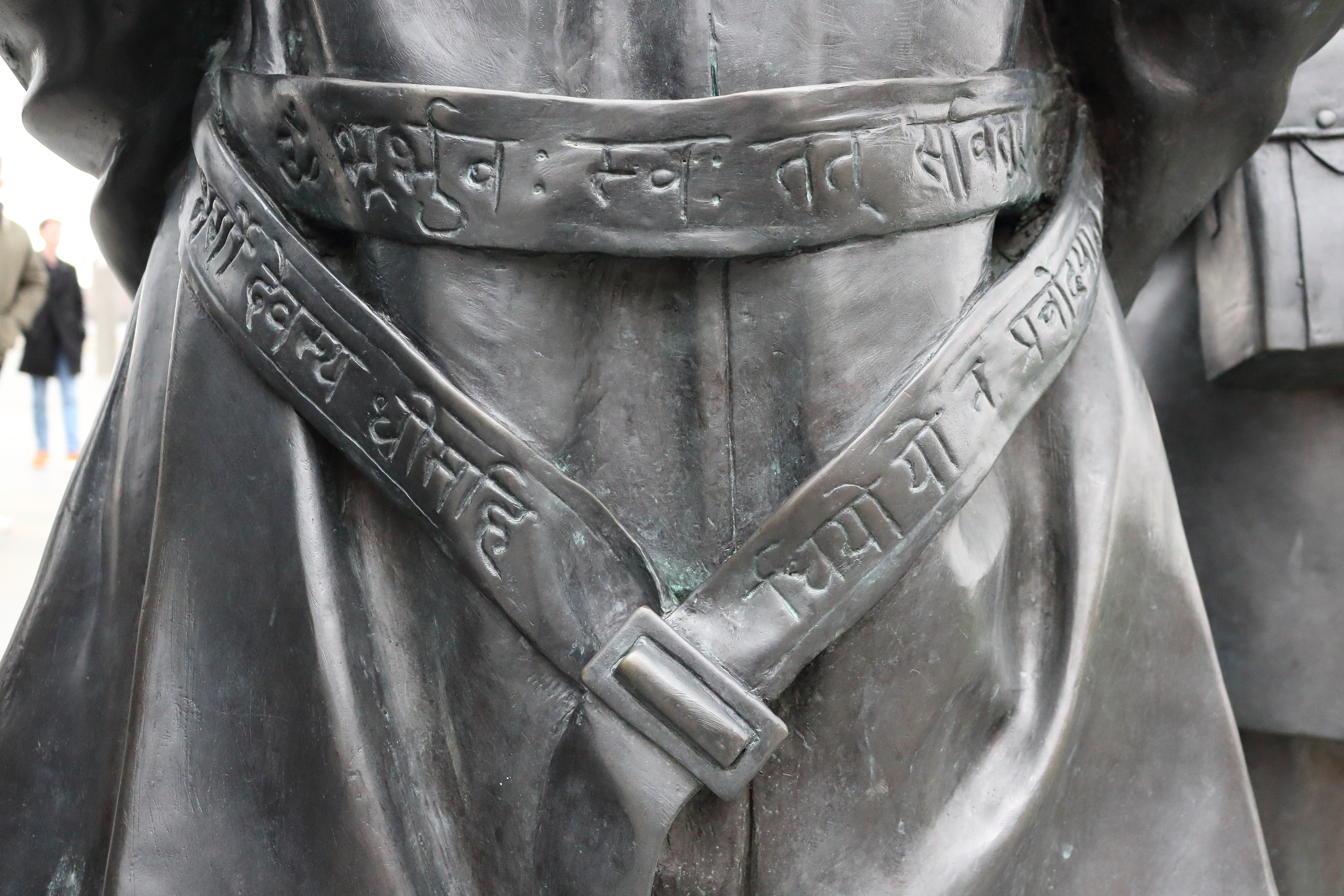
A statue representing the Beatles was unveiled in Liverpool in 2015. Each of them features a symbol expressing a milestone in their respective lives. On the back of George Harrison's belt is engraved the Gayatri Mantra written in the Devanagari script.

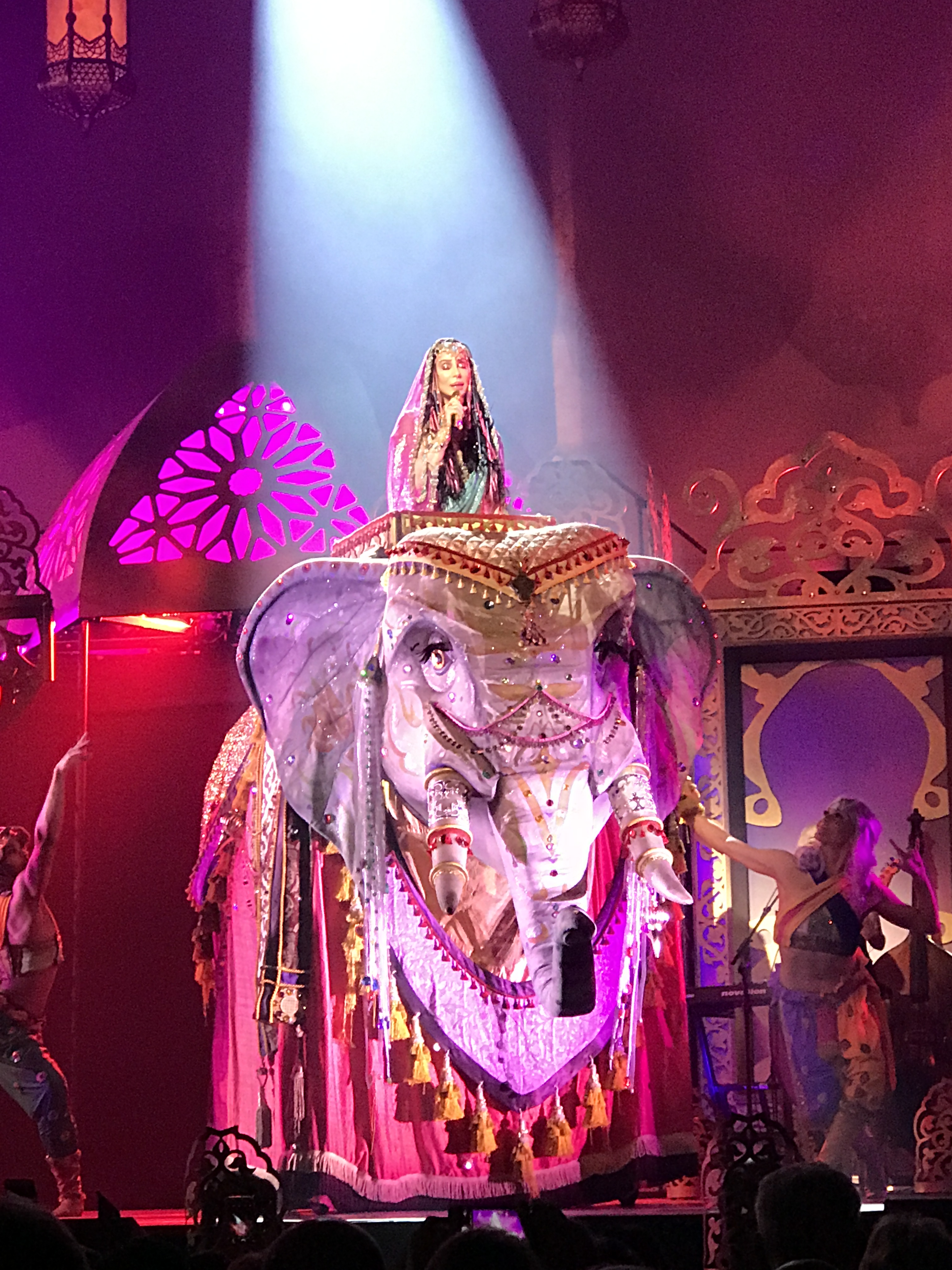
Cher, dressed in the Indian style, performing the song titled "Gayatri Mantra" at a concert in Oxon Hill, Maryland (19 March 2017)

- George Harrison (The Beatles): on the life-size statue representing him, unveiled in 2015 in Liverpool, the Gayatri mantra engraved on the belt, to symbolize a landmark event in his life (see picture).
- A version of the Gayatri mantra is featured in the opening theme song of the TV series Battlestar Galactica (2004).
- A variation on the William Quan Judge translation is also used as the introduction to Kate Bush's song "Lily" on her 1993 album, The Red Shoes.
- Cher, the singer/actress, in her Living Proof: The Farewell Tour, in 2002–2005, sang the Gayatri Mantra while riding a mechanical elephant. She later reprised the performance during her Classic Cher concert residency in 2017–2020 and Here We Go Again Tour in 2018–2020 (see picture).
- The Swiss avantgarde black metal band Schammasch adapted the mantra as the outro in their song "The Empyrean" on their last album "Triangle" as a Gregorian chant.
- The film Mohabbatein (2000) directed by Aditya Chopra which came under controversy when Amitabh Bachchan recited the sacred Gayatri Mantra with his shoes on leading some Vedic scholars in Varanasi to complain that it insulted Hinduism
- In the game Homeworld: Deserts of Kharak (2016), Gayatri Mantra can be heard being sung during the destruction of Gaalsien flagship, Hand of Sajuuk, in the final mission of campaign, Khar-Toba.
- The HBO show The White Lotus (2021) features a character singing a version of the Gayatri Mantra multiple times throughout the first season.
- The TV show Pantheon (TV series) features a modern remix of the Gayatri mantra in the background of a character's uploaded conscioussness working in a loop

== Other Gāyatrī Mantras ==
The term Gāyatrī refers to the Vedic meter in which the main part of the present mantra is composed. A number of other "Gāyatrī mantras" not found in the Rigveda are associated with various Hindu gods and goddesses. Some examples include:

Vishnu Gayatri:

oṃ nārāyaṇāya vidmahe
vāsudēvāya dhīmahī
tannō viṣṇuḥ pracōdayāt

Indra Gayatri:

oṃ devarāja vidmahe
vajrahastya dhīmahī
tannō sakhrah pracōdayāt

Krishna Gayatri:

oṃ devakīnandanaya vidmahe
vāsudevāya dhīmahī
tannō kṛṣṇa pracōdayāt

Shiva Gayatri:

om tatpuruṣāya vidmahe
mahādevāya dhīmahi
tannō rudraḥ pracōdayāt

Ganesha Gayatri:

oṃ ekadantāya vidmahe
vakratuṇḍāya dhīmahi
tannō dantī pracōdayāt

Durga Gayatri:

oṃ kātyāyanyaya vidmahe
kānyākumāryaya dhīmahi
tannō durgā pracōdayāt

Saraswati Gayatri:

oṃ vāgdevyaya ca vidmahe
kāmarājāya dhīmahi
tannō devī pracōdayāt

Lakshmi Gayatri:

oṃ mahādevyāya ca vidmahe
viṣṇupatnyāya ca dhīmahi
tannō lakṣmīḥ pracōdayāt

== See also ==
- Savitr
- Om
- Vedas
- Metre (poetry)

== Sources ==
- Bloomfield, Maurice (1906). A Vedic Concordance: Being an Alphabetic Index to Every Line of Every Stanza of the Published Vedic Literature and to the Liturgical Formulas Thereof; that Is, an Index to the Vedic Mantras, Together with an Account of Their Variations in the Different Vedic Books. Harvard university. ISBN 9788120806542.
- Dutt, Manmatha Nath (1 March 2006). The Dharma Sastra Or the Hindu Law Codes. Kessinger Publishing. ISBN 978-1-4254-8964-9.
- Haas, Dominik (2023). Gāyatrī: Mantra and Mother of the Vedas. Vienna: Austrian Academy of Sciences Press. ISBN 978-3-7001-9391-3.
- Lipner, Julius J. (1994). Hindus: Their Religious Beliefs and Practices. Psychology Press. ISBN 978-0-415-05181-1.
- Radhakrishnan, Sarvepalli (1994). The Bhagavadgita: With an Introductory Essay, Sanskrit Text, English Translation, and Notes. HarperCollins. ISBN 978-81-7223-087-6.
- Rahman, M. M. (1 January 2005). Encyclopaedia of Historiography. Anmol Publications Pvt. Limited. ISBN 978-81-261-2305-6.
- Rinehart, Robin (1 January 2004). Contemporary Hinduism: Ritual, Culture, and Practice. ABC-CLIO. ISBN 978-1-57607-905-8.
- Vedas (1 January 2003). The Vedas: With Illustrative Extracts. Book Tree. ISBN 978-1-58509-223-9.
