= Francisco Caldeira Cabral =

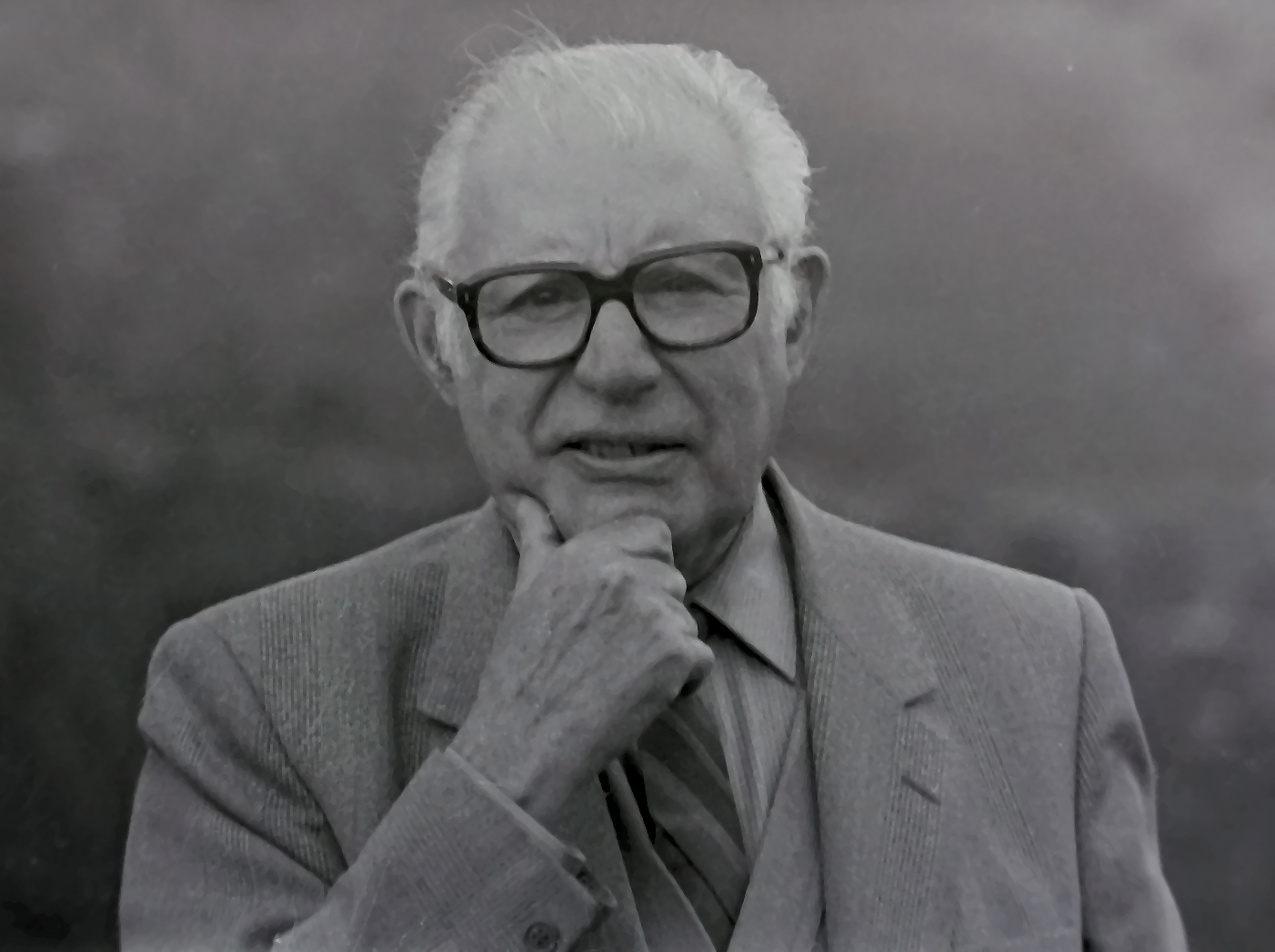
- Born: Francisco Caldeira Cabral; 26 October 1908; Lisbon, Portugal
- Died: 10 November 1992 (aged 84); Coimbra, Portugal
- Education: Instituto Superior de Agronomia
- Occupations: Landscape architect Agronomist
- Awards: Fritz Schumacker
- Projects: Estádio Nacional do Jamor, Oeiras; Rua Augusta, Lisbon; Renovation of Avenida da Liberdade, Lisbon

Francisco Caldeira Cabral GCIH • GOIP (26 October 1908 – 10 November 1992) was a Portuguese landscape architect. He was an active and internationally reputed landscape architect from the 1940s to the 1980s. He was a pioneer in the practice, study and teaching of Landscape Architecture, and he was a pioneer of the Portuguese environmental movement.

== Family ==
He is son of António Caldeira Cabral and his wife Alice Monteiro. He was born in Lisbon on 26 October 1908. Married Alfreda Ferreira da Fonseca (30 June 1909 – 14 January 2001) with whom he had nine children, including Francisco Manuel Caldeira Cabral (landscape architect) and Pedro Caldeira Cabral (musician).

== Biography ==
Francisco Caldeira Cabral studied in Colégio Vasco da Gama, Sintra, and in the Colégio dos Jesuítas de La Guardia (Jesuit School of La Guardia) in Galiza, having finished his high-school studies in 1925. He then decided to study chemistry at Berlin-Charlottenburg Technical University, Germany, requesting some years later a transfer to electric engineering. However, pneumonia forced him to return to Portugal and, between 1931 and 1936, he studied agronomy at the Instituto Superior de Agronomia (ISA, High Institute of Agronomy), Lisbon. After graduating, he returned to Berlin, with a scholarship from Instituto de Alta Cultura and joined the landscape architecture course at Friedrich-Wilhelm University, under Professor Heinrich Friedrich Wiepking-Jürgensmann, and obtained the gardener diploma, in 1939.

He started teaching in 1940 at the Instituto Superior de Agronomia of the Technical University of Lisbon on "Desenho Organográfico" (Drawing) and "Construções Rurais" (Rural Building). Shortly after that, he proposed an open-course on landscape architecture at the ISA – which was accepted. The course was optional and of free access and he started lecturing in 1941. Among his first students were landscape architects Gonçalves Ribeiro Telles and Antonio Viana Barreto who later made important contributions in several areas, including landscape planning and architecture.

In 1965 he was awarded the prize Fritz Schumaker for Landscape Planning. Between 1979 and 1986 he was a guest professor and lecturer at Evora University. During 1956 and 1986 he lectured as a guest at several universities, namely Hannover University (Germany, 1951), Berkeley University (Califórnia, 1962), Georgia University (USA, 1962), Newcastle University (England, 1968), Michigan University (USA, 1968), Escuela Superior de Arquitectura de Madrid (Spain, 1970), Escuela Superior de Ingenieros de Montes (Spain, 1971), Pennsylvania University (USA, 1972) and Instituto Agronomico Mediterraneo (Spain, 1979–1986).

He was president of IFLA (International Federation of Landscape Architects) and a founding member of Liga para a Protecção da Natureza (1948) having been its second president in 1951–52. He also presided over the Nature Conservation Section of the Lisbon Geographic Society [Sociedade de Geografia de Lisboa] in 1956, and proposed in 1963, the creation of a Portuguese Natural Parks and Natural Reserves system. This was in line with his concept of "Continuum Naturale"

He received Portugal honorific titles of "Grande-Oficial da Ordem da Instrução Pública" (6 July 1982) and "Grã-Cruz da Ordem do Infante D. Henrique" (18 March 1989)

In his honour the Centro de Estudos de Arquitectura Paisagista – Prof. Francisco Caldeira Cabral (Study Center on Landscape Architecture) was created in 2002, and in 2008, on the centenary of his birth, his name was given to a garden in Teleheiras, (Lisbon) and to the Francisco Caldeira Cabral Park, in Algés (Oeiras).

=== Continuum Naturale ===
In line with its relationship in regard to man and nature he conceived the "Continuum Naturale" concept.

== Works ==
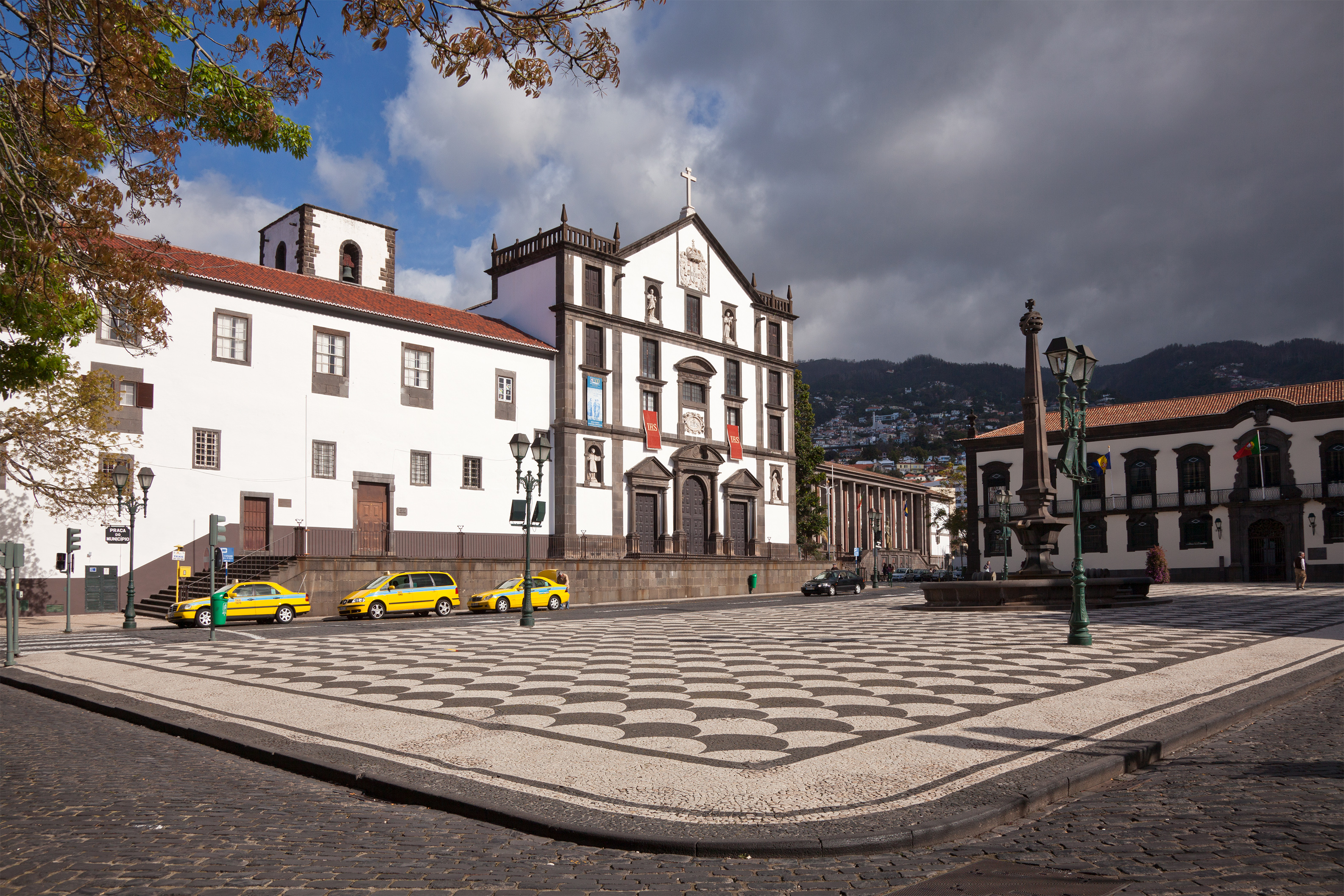
Praça do Municipio, Funchal, Madeira

=== 1940s ===
- 1940: Garden of house of Carneiro Pacheco, Estoril
- 1941: Quinta da Aldeia, in Estação Agronómica Nacional
- 1941–1945: Santa Catarina Park, Funchal, Madeira
- 1942: Renovation of Praça Municipio, Funchal, Madeira
- 1942: Avenida do Mar, Funchal, Madeira
- 1942: São Francisco Garden, Funchal, Madeira
- 1942: Auditorium of Estação Agronómica Nacional
- 1943: Garden of Dr. Carlos Mantero, Cascais<
- 1945 -1950: Gardens and Farm house of Quinta da Agrela
- 1947–1960: House and gardens of Quinta das Vidigueiras, em Reguengos de Monsaraz
- 1947–1963: Arranjos exteriores da Barragem de Belver

=== 1950s ===
- 1954: Garden Constatino Palha, Vila Franca de Xira
- 1957: Landscape planning and gardens of Quinta Patino, Alcoitão (Estoril)
- 1958: Gardens of Quinta dos Aciprestes, Linda-a-Velha (Oeiras)
- 1959: Quinta da Ribafria gardens, Sintra

=== 1960s ===
- 1962: Gardens of Quinta das Laranjeiras, Lisbon
- 1962: Gardens of Termas de Caldelas
- 1962: Gardens of Escola Alemã, em Lisboa (em colaboração com o Arquitecto Paisagista Gonçalo Ribeiro Telles
- 1963: "Jardim de Portugal", Parque Planten und Blumen, Hamburg (Germany)
- 1964: "Jardim de Portugal", Tokyo
- 1965: Landscape planning and gardens of Quinta dos Pesos, Caparide
- 1966: Gardens of Quinta das Lágrimas, Coimbra

=== 1980s ===
- 1981: Expansion of D. Carlos I Park, Caldas da Rainha
- 1981-1982: University of Aveiro Master Plan
- 1986–1987: Renovation and adaptation of the gardens of house Primo Madeira for Universidade do Porto

=== Landscape studies ===
- 1938–1940: Estádio Nacional do Jamor
