= Scar for Life =

Portuguese rock band

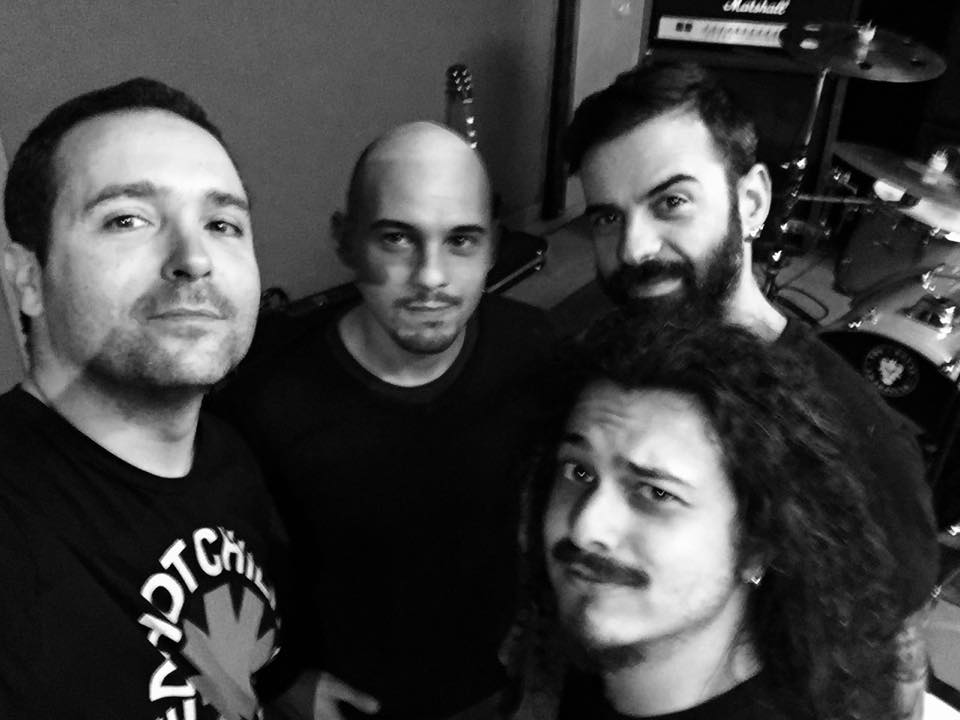
- L–R: Alex Santos, Ricardo Reis, Tëën Asty and Tiago Ian

Background information
- Origin: Lisbon, Portugal
- Genres: Progressive metal, melodic metal, hard rock, power metal
- Years active: 2008–present
- Labels: Infektion Records (2012), Escape Music (2014)
- Website: scarforlife.com

Scar for Life is a Portuguese rock band from Lisbon, formed in 2008 by guitarist/composer Alexandre Santos. As of 2017, the band has released four studio albums, a compilation, a number of singles, and a live album.

Scar For Life's lineup has changed several times over their career. The band has had a number of vocalists, including Marco Resende, Leonel Silva, and Rob Mancini. It has also featured several guest musicians and vocalists who have appeared on their albums over the years including violinist Anne Victorino d'Almeida, Finnish singer Kari Vähäkuopus (Catamenia), Ged Rylands and Neil Fraser (TEN), Neil Murray (Whitesnake, Black Sabbath), Vinny Appice (Black Sabbath, Dio) and Michael Carlsson (Lover Under Cover). The current lineup consists of Rob Mancini on lead vocals, Alexandre Santos and Tëën Asty on guitars, Tiago Ian on bass and Ricardo Reis on drums.

== History ==
Scar for Life began as a solo project for Alex Santos after he left the Portuguese gothic metal band Redstains in March 2008. When composing for the band's first album, the self-titled Scar For Life, Santos decided that he needed more vocalists for the sound he had in mind and recruited Dinho (also from Redstains), Marco Resende (a.k.a. Rez) and Sophie (Understream) to provide the vocals, with Daniel Cardoso (now with Anathema) on drums and Santos providing guitars and bass. All songs were composed by Santos, with lyrics written by Rez, and all instruments were recorded in Santo's Lisbon studio aside from Cardoso's drums, which were recorded at Ultra SoundSystem studio, where the album was mixed.

=== Scar for Life (2008) ===
Scar for Life was released through the band's website and available at first as a free download. This was a deliberate strategy by Santos, who 'preferred to "offer" our debut album than put it for sale' to raise the profile of the band to a Portuguese and international audience. Described as 'unpretentious, confident modern rock injected with metal attitude,' Scar For Life was well received by the press and was described by one reviewer as evidence 'that beneath the surface, talented bands are alive and well in the underground'.

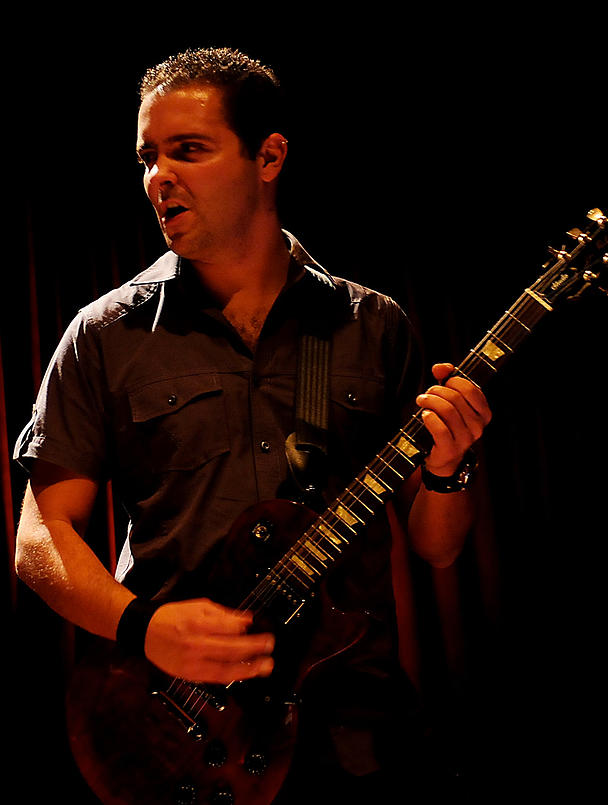
Scar For Life live 2009

Between the release of their first album and their second album, It All Fades Away, in 2010, Scar For Life performed live around Portugal. The band opened for well-known Portuguese metal bands, such as R.A.M.P., headlined shows and played several acoustic showcases around the country. In 2010, the band released Live and Acoustic, featuring songs recorded at some of these showcases. However, the band felt that the quality of Live and Acoustic wasn't up to the standard of a formal live album so this was also released via free download from the band's website as an official 'bootleg' album.

=== It All Fades Away (2010) ===
The band's second album, It All Fades Away, was recorded in May 2010 at PressPlay Studios and UltraSound studios and mixed by Daniel Cardoso at UltraSound's new studio in Moita, Portugal. Again Santos composed the music and Rez wrote the lyrics. This time Sean Rose 'Sales' joined the band as bass player and the album also featured on some tracks guest musicians Bruno A. and Tó Pica (from R.A.M.P.) on lead guitars. It All Fades Away was considered a 'worthwhile sequel' to the band's debut album and was a mixture of 'traditional Heavy Metal, a little Thrash Metal and some samplings of Progressive Metal.'

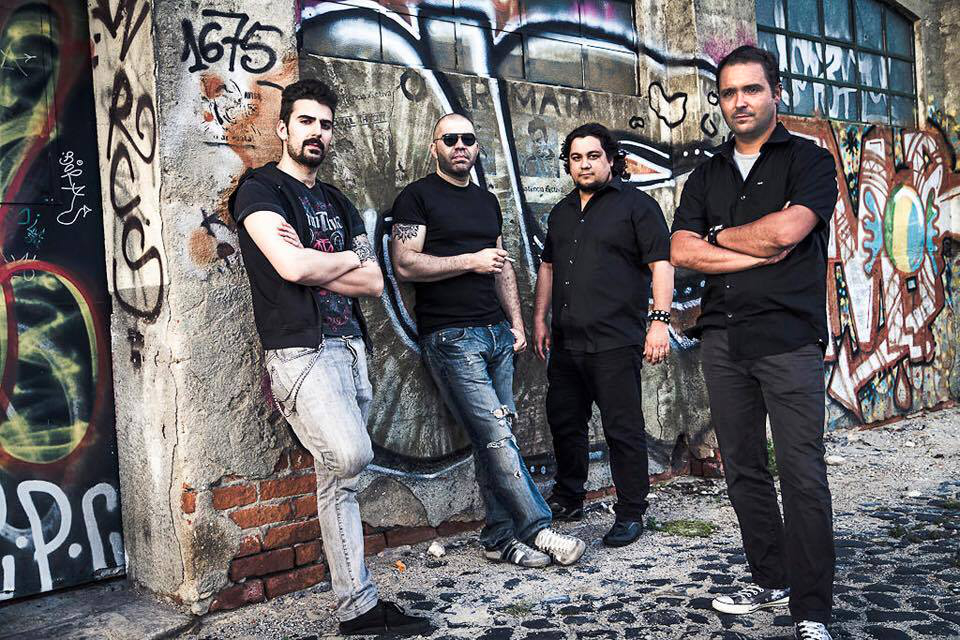
Scar For Life promoshoot from 2012

=== 3 Minute Silence (2012) ===
Between the release of It All Fades Away and the band's third album, 3 Minute Silence, Scar For Life went through several changes. Rez and Daniel Cardoso left the band early in 2012 and were replaced by Leonel Silva and João Colaço on vocals and drums, respectively. Leonel Silva also took over writing the lyrics for Alexandre Santos' compositions, bringing a 'breeze of freshness' to the band, and Sérgio Faria played lead guitars on some tracks.

Released in September 2012 by Infektion Records, 3 Minute Silence was considered by Scar For Life to be by far their most ambitious work to that point and the release was accompanied with their first single, "Old Man", and a video filmed and directed in Canada by Dustin Warnock. Exploring a heavier and more melodic side of the band, 3 Minute Silence featured guests such as violinist Anne Vitorino d'Almeida, Finnish singer Kari Vähäkuopus (Catamenia) and British keyboardist Ged Ryland (ex-Ten).

=== Retrospective (2013) ===
To celebrate the five-year anniversary of Scar For Life, the band released a compilation, Retrospective, for free download on their website. Including songs from their first three albums and one new instrumental track, "Retrospective", featuring Neil Murray of Whitesnake on bass, Scar For Life promoted the compilation with live performances in London and Portugal.

=== Worlds Entwined (2014) ===
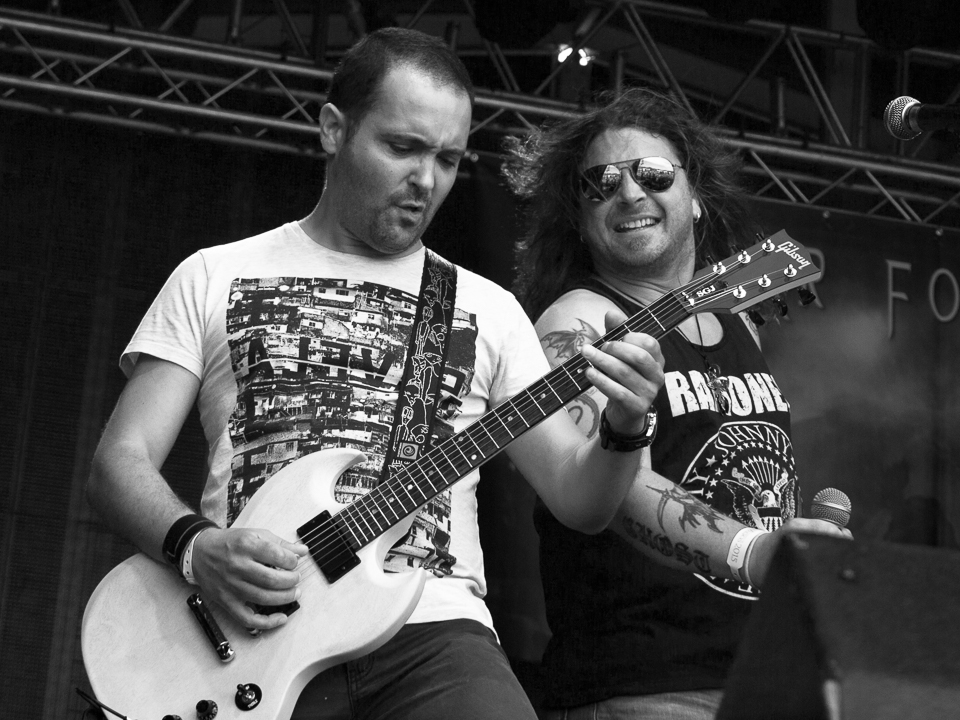
Alex Santos and Rob Mancini SFL at VOA 2015

In 2014, Scar for Life signed with Escape Records and there were some major changes in the lineup of the band. Guitarist Tëën Asty joined and when Leonel Silva left, Irish singer Rob Mancini took over lead vocals and writing the lyrics for the band's fourth studio album, Worlds Entwined. The album was mixed by Swedish producer Martin Kronlund and featured guests such as Vinny Appice (Black Sabbath, Dio), Mikael Carlsson (Lover Under Cover) and Neil Fraser (TEN). In Spring 2015, João Colaço left Scar For Life and the line-up was completed with Tiago Ian on bass and Ricardo Reis on drums. Scar For Life released two singles from Worlds Entwined: Thirteen Revolution in August 2014 and Wish You Well in April 2015, accompanied by a video also directed by Dustin Warnock.

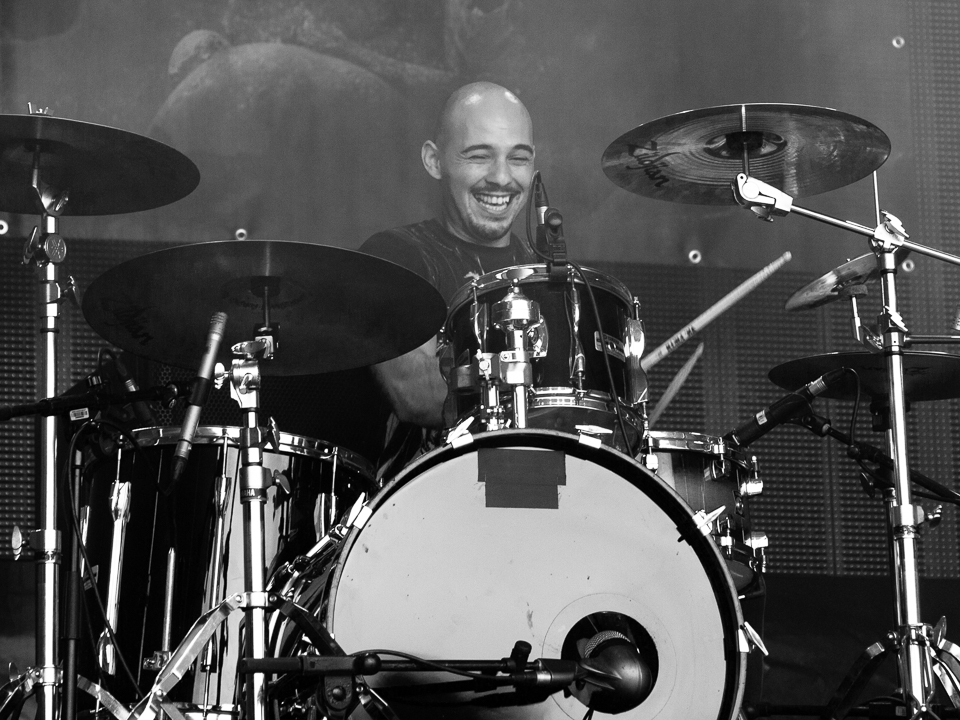
Ricardo Reis SFL at VOA 2015

In August 2015, Scar For Life opened the Portuguese heavy metal festival Vagos Open Air, alongside such bands as Black Label Society, Destruction, Overkill and Within Temptation. In September 2015 Rob Mancini announced that he was taking a break from Scar For Life to pursue other projects and the other members of Scar For Life are taking a 'time out' while searching for a replacement vocalist and lyricist.

Alexandre Santos is working on new material for a concept album with a band called Stagma, Tëën Asty is working on his first solo album, as yet untitled, and Tiago Ian and Ricardo Reis are working on side projects. Santos is also working on new material for Scar For Life and the band aims to be back in the studio in the spring of 2017. In August 2017, Rob Mancini was approached to be the lead singer and vocalist for Stagma and Santos and Mancini rekindled their working relationship. Soon after Rob Mancini reunited with Scar For Life and confirmed that he would be the lead singer and vocalist on the band's fifth studio album.

== Members ==
=== Current members ===
Rob Mancini – vocals (2014–2015, 2017–present)

Alexandre Santos – guitar (2008–present)

Marc Lynn – bass (2019–present)

=== Former members ===
Marco Resende – vocals (2008–2012)

Daniel Cardoso – drums, piano (2008–2012)

Sean Rose 'Sales' – bass (2010)

Sophie – backing vocals (2008–2010)

Leonel Silva – vocals (2012–2014)

Sérgio Faria – lead guitars (2012)

João Colaço – drums (2012–2015)

=== Timeline ===
Discography
Scar For Life (2008)	Marco Resende – vocals; Alexandre Santos – guitar, bass guitar; Daniel Cardoso – drums; Sophie – backing vocals; Dinho – vocals on track No. 1 and No. 2
It All Fades Away (2010)	Marco Resende – vocals; Alexandre Santos – guitar, rhythm guitar; Daniel Cardoso – drums; Sean Rose 'Sales' – bass guitar; Daniel Cardoso – drums; Bruno A. – lead guitar; Tó Pica – lead guitar; Sophie – backing vocals
3 Minute Silence (2012)	Leonel Silva – vocals; Alexandre Santos – guitar, bass guitar & FX; Sérgio Faria – lead guitar on tracks No. 6 & No. 11; João Colaço – drums; Anne Victorino d'Almeida – violin & arrangements on tracks No. 7 & No. 10; Kari Vähäkuopus – chorus on track No. 4; Ged Rylands – keyboards on track No. 11; Nelson Raposo – [piano] on tracks No. 3, #6 & No. 10; Jane Castro – backing vocals
Retrospective (2013)	Marco Resende – vocals on tracks #1–7; Leonel Silva – vocals on tracks #8–10; Alexandre Santos – guitar and bass guitar; Sean Rose – bass guitar on tracks #4–7; Sérgio Faria – lead guitar on tracks No. 6 and No. 11; Daniel Cardoso – drums on tracks #1–7; João Colaço – drums on tracks #8–10; Neil Murray – bass on track No. 11; Neil Fraser – lead guitar on track No. 11; Rómulo Herédia – drums on track No. 11
Worlds Entwined (2014)	Rob Mancini – vocals; Alexandre Santos – guitar; Teen Asty – bass guitar; João Colaço – drums; Vinny Appice – drums on track No. 01; Tó Pica – lead guitar on track#03; Neil Fraser – lead guitar on track#05; Mikael Carlsson – keyboards on track#11; Anne Victorino d'Almeida – violin on track#11
