= Vagos Open Air =

Music festival in Lisbon, Portugal

VOA – Heavy Rock Festival
- Genre: Heavy metal, hard rock and all its sub-genres
- Dates: June–August
- Locations: Lisbon, Portugal
- Years active: 2009–2017, 2019–2022
- Website: voa.rocks

VOA – Heavy Rock Festival (formerly VOA Fest and Vagos Open Air) was an open-air heavy metal/hard rock festival held annually in Lisbon, Portugal. The festival was held from 2009 in four different locations: the first four editions, from 2009 to 2012, were held in Calvão (a small town in the municipality of Vagos, near Aveiro), the next three (2013 to 2015) were held in the town of Vagos, the following two editions (2016 and 2017) were held in Corroios, a city in the municipality of Seixal, and after a year break the festival returned in 2019 in Lisbon. It was organized by Prime Artists, a Portuguese event promoter.

The origins of a music festival in the Aveiro region are traced to a small event, called Rock in Ria, featuring a few Portuguese and international bands, but in 2009 that event gave way to a new full-fledged international festival which turned out to be one of the biggest heavy metal festivals in Portugal.

In late 2015, it was then announced the festival would relocate from Vagos to the city of Corroios. The name of the festival was also changed from Vagos Open Air to VOA Fest.

A few months later, the municipality of Vagos ensured the creation of a new heavy metal festival in the city, named Vagos Metal Fest. The new festival held the first edition in 2016, featuring Dark Funeral and Helloween as headliners. It is organized by Amazing Events, a Portuguese event promoter.

In 2018, after a sabbatical year, Prime Artists announced on their Facebook page the return of the event for 2019. It returned to a two-day festival, on July 4 and 5, changed name (to VOA – Heavy Rock Festival), changed location and venue (moving to Estádio do Restelo in the city of Lisbon) and had Slipknot – one of the biggest names to ever perform in the festival – as one of the headliners.

In 2022, the final festival took place in Estádio Nacional, in Oeiras.

== Lineups ==
=== 2009 ===
2009 saw the first incarnation of the festival, a two-day event held on Friday, 7 August and Saturday, 8 August at GD Calvão's football ground (Campo de Futebol Padre Batista) in the village of Calvão, near Vagos.

Friday	Saturday
F.E.V.E.R. Process of Guilt; Kathaarsys; Epica; Katatonia; The Gathering	Echidna; Thee Orakle; Dawn of Tears; Cynic; Dark Tranquillity; Amon Amarth

=== 2010 ===
The 2010 edition was held on Friday, 6 August and Saturday, 7 August.

Friday	Saturday
Prayers of Sanity; Miss Lava; Gwydion; Ensiferum; My Dying Bride; Meshuggah	The Firstborn; Oblique Rain; Ghost Brigade; Amorphis; Kamelot; Carcass

=== 2011 ===
The 2011 edition was held on Friday, 5 August and Saturday, 6 August.

Friday	Saturday
Revolution Within; Crushing Sun; Essence; Anathema; Tiamat; Opeth	We Are the Damned; Malevolence; Kalmah; Ihsahn; Devin Townsend Project; Morbid Angel

=== 2012 ===
The 2012 edition was held on Friday, 3 August and Saturday, 4 August.

Friday	Saturday
Disaffected; Northland; Eluveitie; Enslaved; Arcturus; At the Gates; Nasum [Special guests]	Mindlock; Chthonic; Textures; Coroner; Overkill; Arch Enemy

=== 2013 ===
The 2013 edition was held on Friday, 9 August and Saturday, 10 August. The festival was moved to Quinta do Ega, a place in the city of Vagos.

Friday	Saturday
Secret Lie; Bizarra Locomotiva; Moonsorrow; Evergrey; Sonata Arctica; Lacuna Coil	Web; Tarantula; Rotting Christ; Iced Earth; Gamma Ray (replacing Saxon); Testament

=== 2014 ===
The 2014 edition saw Vagos Open Air became a three-day festival with the addition of Sunday. It was held on Friday, 8 August, Saturday, 9 August and Sunday, 10 August.

Friday	Saturday	Sunday
Gates of Hell; Kandia; Sylosis; Soilwork; Epica; Kreator	Requiem Laus; Angelus Apatrida; The Haunted; Behemoth; Annihilator; Opeth	Opus Diabolicum; Murk; Vita Imana; The Quartet of Woah! Paradise Lost; Gojira

=== 2015 ===
The 2015 edition was held on Friday, 7 August, Saturday, 8 August and Sunday, 9 August. It was the final edition in the municipality of Vagos.

Friday	Saturday	Sunday
Scar for Life; Moonshade; Vildhjarta; Heaven Shall Burn; Amorphis; Within Temptation	W.A.K.O. Mutant Squad; Destruction; Triptykon; Black Label Society; Venom; Filii Nigrantium Infernalium [Special guests]	Midnight Priest; Ne Obliviscaris; Alestorm; Orphaned Land; Overkill; Bloodbath; Ironsword [Special guests]

=== 2016 ===
The 2016 edition was held on Friday, 5 August and Saturday, 6 August, returning to a two-day lineup. The festival was renamed VOA Fest and moved to Quinta da Marialva, a place in the city of Corroios, Seixal. A new festival called Vagos Metal Fest. was created exactly on the same location of the past editions.

Friday	Saturday
Dark Oath; Adimiron; Mantar; Katatonia; Anathema; Opeth	Soldier; Equaleft; Schammasch; Abbath; Paradise Lost; Kreator

=== 2017 ===
The 2017 edition returned to a three-day format. For the first time, the festival was held on two stages, as a new secondary stage was added (exclusive to Portuguese bands). It was held on Friday, 4 August, Saturday, 5 August and Sunday, 6 August.

Palco Principal (Main Stage)
Friday	Saturday	Sunday
Process of Guilt; The Charm The Fury; Insomnium; Epica; Carcass	Terror Empire; Childrain; Death Angel; Venom; Apocalyptica	Colosso; Killus; Obituary; The Dillinger Escape Plan; Trivium

Palco LOUD! (LOUD! Stage)
Friday	Saturday	Sunday
Névoa; Earth Drive; The Black Wizards	Adamantine; Cruz de Ferro; Rasgo	Don't Disturb My Circles; Grog; The Ominous Circle

=== 2019 ===
The 2019 edition returned to a two-day format. Renamed to VOA – Heavy Rock Festival, it was held on Estádio do Restelo, in the city of Lisbon, on Thursday, 4 July and Friday, 5 July.

Thursday	Friday
Rasgo; While She Sleeps; Thormentor; Trivium; Arch Enemy; Slipknot	W.A.K.O. Cane Hill; Moonspell; Gojira; Lamb of God; Slayer

2022

The last and final 2022 edition happened in Estádio Nacional, in Oeiras, on Thursday, 30 June, Friday, 1 July and Saturday, 2 July

Thursday	Friday	Saturday
BIZARRA LOCOMOTIVA KVELERTAK KREATOR MEGADETH GOJIRA	ALIEN WEAPONRY GAEREA CROSSFAITH PHIL CAMPBELL AND THE BASTARD SONS MASTODON BRING ME THE HORIZON	DEADLY APPLES THE RAVEN AGE ME AND THAT MAN EPICA RISE AGAINST SABATON
