= Trisandya =

Hindu tradition

The Trisandya (from Sanskrit: त्रिसन्ध्या पूजा, romanized: Trisandhyā Puja, lit. 'three-cusp prayer') is a commonly used prayer in Indian Hinduism & Balinese Hinduism. It is uttered three times each day: 6 am, noon, and 6 pm, in line with the Sandhyavandanam tradition.

== History ==
Before Indonesian independence, standardized prayers did not exist in Balinese Hinduism. Only brahmins recited mantras in temple environments. After the declaration of Indonesian independence in 1945, Sukarno enshrined the Pancasila, or Five Principles, as the basis of the new state, the first of which is "Belief in the one and only God". The Ministry of Religious Affairs, created in 1946 to enforce this principle, initially did not recognize Hinduism, and its adherents faced pressure to convert to either Christianity or Islam.

Balinese Hindus systematically reformed the religion along Abrahamic lines to gain official recognition. One such reform was the synthesis of the Puja Tri Sandya, which was modelled along the Adhan (call to prayer) in Islam and the Angelus prayer in Christianity. Starting from the 1950s, the mantra was taught to schoolchildren. After the granting of official religious status to Hinduism in 1963, the Puja Tri Sandhya began to be broadcast on loudspeakers and radios. Starting in the 1980s, it was also broadcast on television.

== Text ==
Sanskrit (Devanagari)	Sanskrit (IAST)	English
ओं, ओं, ओं भूर् भुवः स्वः तत् सवितुर् वरेण्यं भर्गो देवस्य धीमहि धियो यो नः प्रचोदयात्	Oṁ, Oṁ, Oṁ; Bhūr bhuvaḥ svaḥ Tat savitur vareṇyaṃ Bhargo devasya dhīmahi Dhiyo yo naḥ pracodayāt	OM, OM, OM, is the Earth, Sky, and the Heavens. Let us meditate on the light of the Sun and may our thoughts be inspired by that divine light. (Note: The first part of this mantra was derived from the Gayatri Mantra.)
ओं नारायण एवेदं सर्वाम् यद् भूतं यच् च भव्यम् निष्कलङ्को निरञ्जनो निर्विकल्पो निराख्यातः शुधो देव एको नारायणः न द्वितीयो अस्ति कश्चित्	Oṁ Nārāyaṇa evedaṁ Sarvām; Yad bhūtaṁ yac ca bhavyam Niṣkalaṅko nirañjano nirvikalpo Nirākhyātaḥ śudho deva eko Nārāyaṇaḥ na dvitīyo asti kaścit	OM, Narayana is all that has been and what will be, free from taint, free from dirt, ever existing and without form, Holy God Narayana, He is the only one and there is no other.
ओं त्वं शिवस् त्वं महादेवः ईश्वरः परमेश्वरः ब्रह्मा विष्णुश् च रुद्रश् च पुरुषः परिकीर्तिताः	Oṁ tvaṁ Śivas tvaṁ Mahādevaḥ; Īśvaraḥ Parameśvaraḥ; Brahmā Viṣṇuś ca Rudraś ca Puruṣaḥ Parikīrtitāḥ	OM, You are Shiva, You are the Great God; You are Ishvara, Parameshvara; You are Brahma, Vishnu, and Rudra; You are Purusha, the supreme soul, and the source of everything.
ओं पापो हं पापकर्माहं पापात्मा पापसंभवः त्राहि मां पुङ्डरिकाक्षः सबाह्या भ्यान्तरः शुचिः	Oṁ Pāpo ’haṁ pāpakarmāhaṁ Pāpātmā pāpasaṁbhavaḥ Trāhi māṁ puṅḍarikākṣaḥ Sabāhyā bhyāntaraḥ śuciḥ	OM, I am full of sin, my action is sinful, I myself am sinful, and my birth is sinful, save me, O Lotus-Eyed One, purify my body and mind.
ओं क्षमस्व माम् महादेवः सर्वाप्राङि हिताङ्करः माम् मोच सर्वा पापेभ्यः पालयस्व सदाशिव	Oṁ Kṣamasva mām Mahādevaḥ; Sarvāprāṅi hitāṅkaraḥ Mām moca Sarvā pāpebhyaḥ Pālayasva sadāśiva	OM, forgive me, Great God, You who give salvation to all sentient beings, save me from my sins and protect me, O Sada Shiva.
ओं क्षमस्व माम् महादेवः सर्वाप्राङि हिताङ्करः माम् मोच सर्वा पापेभ्यः पालयस्व सदाशिव	Oṁ Kṣantavyaḥ kāyiko doṣāḥ Kṣantavyo vāciko mama Kṣantavyo mānaso doṣaḥ tat Pramādāt Kṣamasva mām	OM, forgive my wrong actions, forgive my wrong speech, forgive my sinful mind, forgive me for all of my misdeeds.
ओं शान्तिः शान्तिः शान्तिः ओं	Oṁ Śāntiḥ Śāntiḥ Śāntiḥ Oṁ	OM, may there be peace, peace, peace, OM.

== See also ==
- Shaivism
