= UEFA Euro 2004 bids =

Bidding process for 2004 UEFA European Football Championship

The bidding process for UEFA Euro 2004 ended on 11 October 1999 in Aachen, Germany when Portugal was selected as the host, beating out Spain and the joint bid of Austria and Hungary.

== History ==
By October 1999, only three bids left to fight for earning the right to host Euro 2004:

- Portugal
- Austria–Hungary (joint bid)
- Spain

The UEFA Executive Committee voted on the bids on 12 October 1999, and chose Portugal as the winning bid.

== Bids ==
=== Portugal ===
The bid was launched on 1 June 1998. The proposed venues for the bid were the following:

- Lisbon – Estádio da Luz
- Lisbon – Estádio José Alvalade
- Porto – Estádio do Dragão
- Porto – Estádio do Bessa
- Braga – Estádio Municipal de Braga
- Aveiro – Estádio Municipal de Aveiro
- Coimbra – Estádio Cidade de Coimbra
- Guimarães – Estádio D. Afonso Henriques
- Leiria – Estádio Dr. Magalhães Pessoa
- Faro/Loulé – Estádio Algarve

=== Spain ===
The bid was launched on 8 November 1996. The proposed venues for the bid were the following:

- Madrid – Santiago Bernabéu
- Madrid – Vicente Calderón
- Barcelona – Camp Nou
- Barcelona – Montjuic Olympic Stadium
- Valencia – Mestalla
- Sevilla – La Cartuja
- Bilbao – San Mames
- A Coruña – Riazor
- Zaragoza – La Romareda
- Vigo – Balaídos
- Palma de Mallorca – Son Moix
- San Sebastian – Anoeta
- Valladolid – Jose Zorrilla
- Granada – New Los Carmenes
- Oviedo – New Tartiere

=== Austria–Hungary ===
The bid was launched in June 1997. The proposed venues for the bid were the following:

Austria

- Vienna – Ernst Happel Stadium
- Salzburg – Salzburg-Wals Stadium
- Innsbruck – Tivoli Stadium
- Graz – Arnold Schwarzenegger Stadium
- St. Pölten – Niederosterreich Arena

Hungary

- Budapest – Nép Stadium
- Budapest – Ferencváros Stadium
- Debrecen – Nagyerdei Stadion
- Székesfehérvár – Sóstói Stadion
- Győr – Rába Eto Stadium
