= Schammasch =

Swiss metal band

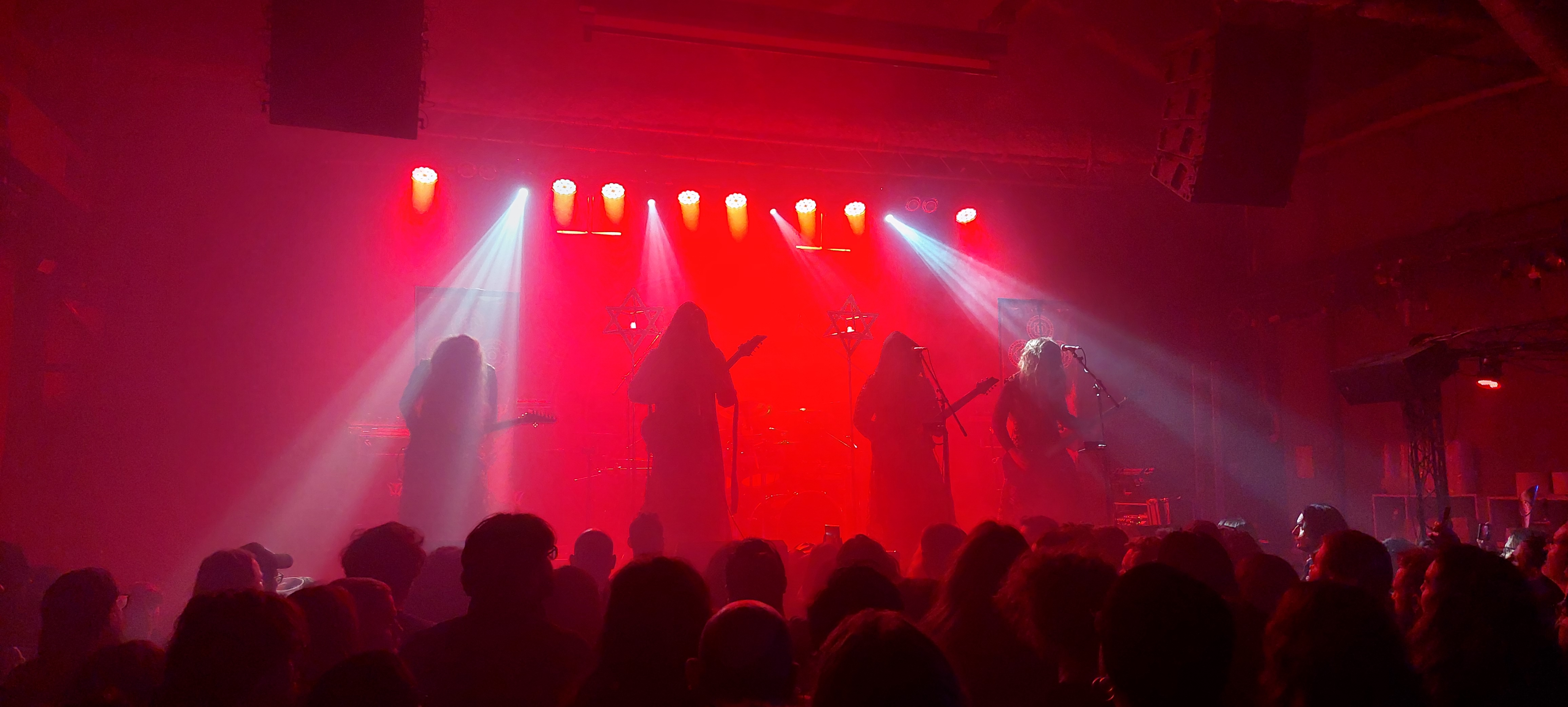
Schammasch at Sala Bóveda de Barcelona, 2023.

Schammasch is a Swiss avant-garde black metal band. They have released six albums, five of which on Prosthetic Records.

The band was formed in 2009. Based in Basel, its name is derived from the ancient Mesopotamian sun god Šamaš. They made their album debut in 2010 with Sic Lvceat Lvx Black Tower Productions and were subsequently signed on Prosthetic Records.

A guitarist and the drummer have also played in the symphonic black metal band Atritas, who released the albums Where Witches Burnt (2004), Medium Antigod (2007) and Celestial Decay (2009).

== Discography ==
- Sic Lvceat Lvx (2010)
- Contradiction (2014)
- Triangle (2016)
- The Maldoror Chants: Hermaphrodite (2017)
- Hearts of No Light (2019)
- The Maldoror Chants: Old Ocean (2024)
