= Baudhayana sutras =

Group of Vedic Sanskrit texts

The Baudhāyana sūtras (Sanskrit: बौधायन सूत्रस् ) are a group of Vedic Sanskrit texts which cover dharma, daily ritual, mathematics and is one of the oldest Dharma-related texts of Hinduism that have survived into the modern age from the 1st-millennium BCE. They belong to the Taittiriya branch of the Krishna Yajurveda school and are among the earliest texts of the genre.

The Baudhayana sūtras consist of six texts:

1. the Śrautasûtra, probably in 19 Praśnas (questions),
2. the Karmāntasûtra in 20 Adhyāyas (chapters),
3. the Dwaidhasûtra in 4 Praśnas,
4. the Grihyasutra in 4 Praśnas,
5. the Dharmasûtra in 4 Praśnas and
6. the Śulbasûtra in 3 Adhyāyas.

The Baudhāyana Śulbasûtra is noted for containing several early mathematical results, including an approximation of the square root of 2 and the statement of the Pythagorean theorem.

== Baudhāyana Shrautasūtra ==
Baudhayana's Śrauta sūtras related to performing Vedic sacrifices have followers in some Smārta brāhmaṇas (Iyers) and some Iyengars of Tamil Nadu, Yajurvedis or Namboothiris of Kerala, Gurukkal Brahmins (Aadi Saivas) and Kongu Vellalars. The followers of this sūtra follow a different method and do 24 Tila-tarpaṇa, as Lord Krishna had done tarpaṇa on the day before amāvāsyā; they call themselves Baudhāyana Amavasya.

== Baudhāyana Dharmasūtra ==
The Dharmasūtra of Baudhāyana like that of Apastamba also forms a part of the larger Kalpasutra. Likewise, it is composed of praśnas which literally means 'questions' or books. The structure of this Dharmasūtra is not very clear because it came down in an incomplete manner. Moreover, the text has undergone alterations in the form of additions and explanations over a period of time. The praśnas consist of the Srautasutra and other ritual treatises, the Sulvasutra which deals with vedic geometry, and the Grhyasutra which deals with domestic rituals.

There are no commentaries on this Dharmasūtra with the exception of Govindasvāmin's Vivaraṇa. The date of the commentary is uncertain but according to Olivelle it is not very ancient. Also the commentary is inferior in comparison to that of Haradatta on Āpastamba and Gautama.

This Dharmasūtra is divided into four books. Olivelle states that Book One and the first sixteen chapters of Book Two are the 'Proto-Baudhayana' even though this section has undergone alteration. Scholars like Bühler and Kane agree that the last two books of the Dharmasūtra are later additions. Chapter 17 and 18 in Book Two lays emphasis on various types of ascetics and acetic practices.

The first book is primarily devoted to the student and deals in topics related to studentship. It also refers to social classes, the role of the king, marriage, and suspension of Vedic recitation. Book two refers to penances, inheritance, women, householder, orders of life, ancestral offerings. Book three refers to holy householders, forest hermit and penances. Book four primarily refers to the yogic practices and penances along with offenses regarding marriage.

== Baudhāyana Śulbasūtra ==
=== Pythagorean theorem ===
The Baudhāyana Śulbasūtra states the rule referred to today in most of the world as the Pythagorean Theorem . For the most part, the Śulvasūtras do not contain proofs of the rules which they describe. While the underlying principles of the theorem were known to the Old Babylonians, the earliest extant verbal expression of the Pythagorean theorem is found in the Baudhayana Sulbasutra. The rule stated in the Baudhāyana Śulvasūtra is:

दीर्घचतुरस्रस्याक्ष्णया रज्जुः पार्श्वमानी तिर्यग् मानी च यत् पृथग् भूते कुरूतस्तदुभयं करोति ॥

dīrghachatursrasyākṣaṇayā rajjuḥ pārśvamānī, tiryagmānī,
cha yatpṛthagbhūte kurutastadubhayāṅ karoti.

The diagonal of an oblong produces by itself both the areas which the two sides of the oblong produce separately.

The diagonal and sides referred to are those of a rectangle (oblong), and the areas are those of the squares having these line segments as their sides. Since the diagonal of a rectangle is the hypotenuse of the right triangle formed by two adjacent sides, the statement is seen to be equivalent to the Pythagorean theorem.

Baudhāyana also provides a statement using a rope measure of the reduced form of the Pythagorean theorem for an isosceles right triangle:

The cord which is stretched across a square produces an area double the size of the original square.

=== Circling the square ===
Another problem tackled by Baudhāyana is that of finding a circle whose area is the same as that of a square (the reverse of squaring the circle). His sūtra i.58 gives this construction:

Draw half its diagonal about the centre towards the East–West line; then describe a circle together with a third part of that which lies outside the square.

Explanation:

- Draw the half-diagonal of the square, which is larger than the half-side by $x = {a \over 2}\sqrt{2}- {a \over 2}$.
- Then draw a circle with radius ${a \over 2} + {x \over 3}$, or ${a \over 2} + {a \over 6}(\sqrt{2}-1)$, which equals ${a \over 6}(2 + \sqrt{2})$.
- Now $(2+\sqrt{2})^2 \approx 11.66 \approx {36.6\over \pi}$, so the area ${\pi}r^2 \approx \pi \times {a^2 \over 6^2} \times {36.6\over \pi} \approx a^2$.

=== Square root of 2 ===
Baudhāyana i.61-2 (elaborated in Āpastamba Sulbasūtra i.6) gives the length of the diagonal of a square in terms of its sides, which is equivalent to a formula for the square root of 2:

samasya dvikaraṇī. pramāṇaṃ tṛtīyena vardhayet
tac caturthenātmacatustriṃśonena saviśeṣaḥ

The diagonal [lit. "doubler"] of a square. The measure is to be increased by a third and by a fourth decreased by the 34th. That is its diagonal approximately.

That is,

$$\sqrt{2} \approx  1 + \frac{1}{3} + \frac{1}{3 \cdot 4} - \frac{1}{3 \cdot4 \cdot 34} = \frac{577}{408} \approx 1.414216,$$

which is correct to five decimals.

Other theorems include: diagonals of rectangle bisect each other, diagonals of rhombus bisect at right angles, area of a square formed by joining the middle points of a square is half of original, the midpoints of a rectangle joined forms a rhombus whose area is half the rectangle, etc.

Note the emphasis on rectangles and squares; this arises from the need to specify yajña bhūmikās—i.e. the altar on which rituals were conducted, including fire offerings (yajña).

== See also ==
- Indian mathematics
- List of Indian mathematicians
