= Gautama Dharmasutra =

Sanskrit text

Gautama Dharmasūtra is a Sanskrit text and likely one of the oldest Hindu Dharmasutras (600-200 BCE), whose manuscripts have survived into the modern age.

The Gautama Dharmasutra was composed and survives as an independent treatise, unattached to a complete Kalpa-sūtras, but like all Dharmasutras it may have been part of one whose Shrauta- and Grihya-sutras have been lost to history. The text belongs to Samaveda schools, and its 26th chapter on penance theory is borrowed almost completely from Samavidhana Brahmana layer of text in the Samaveda.

The text is notable that it mentions many older texts and authorities on Dharma, which has led scholars to conclude that there existed a rich genre of Dharmasutras text in ancient India before this text was composed.

== Authorship and dates ==
Testimony during a trial

The witness must take an oath before deposing.
Single witness normally does not suffice.
As many as three witnesses are required.
False evidence must face sanctions.

— Gautama Dharmasutras 13.2-13.6

The Dharmasutra is attributed to Gautama, a Brahmin family name, many of whose members founded the various Shakhas (Vedic schools) of Samaveda. The text was likely composed in the Ranayaniya branch of Samaveda tradition, generally corresponding to where modern Maratha people reside (Maharashtra-Gujarat). The text is likely ascribed to revered sage Gautama of a remote era, but authored by members of this Samaveda school as an independent treatise.

Kane estimated that Gautama Dharmasastra dates from approximately 600-400 BCE. However, Olivelle states that this text discusses the progeny of Greeks with the word Yavana, whose arrival and stay in substantial numbers in northwest India is dated after Darius I (~500 BCE). The Yavana are called border people in the Edict of Ashoka (256 BCE), states Olivelle, and given Gautama gives them importance as if they are non-border people, this text is more likely to have been composed after the Ashoka's Edict, that is after mid 3rd century BCE. Olivelle states that the Apastamba Dharmasutra is more likely the oldest extant text in Dharmasutras genre, followed by Gautama Dharmasastra. Robert Lingat, however, states that the mention of Yavana in the text is isolated, and this minor usage could well have referred to Greco-Bactrian kingdoms whose border reached into northwest Indian subcontinent well before the Ashoka era. Lingat maintains that the Gautama Dharmasastra may well pre-date 400 BCE, and he and other scholars consider it to be the oldest extant Dharmasutra.

Regardless of the relative chronology, the ancient Gautama Dharmasutra, states Olivelle, shows clear signs of a maturing legal procedure tradition and the parallels between the two texts suggest that significant Dharma literature existed before these texts were composed in 1st millennium BCE.

The foundational roots of the text may pre-date Buddhism because it reveres the Vedas and uses terms such as Bhikshu for monks, which later became associated with Buddhists, and instead of Yati or Sannyasi terms that became associated with Hindus. There is evidence that some passages, such as those related to castes and mixed marriages, were likely interpolated into this text and altered at the later date.

== Organization and content ==
The text is composed entirely in prose, in contrast to other surviving Dharmasutras which contain some verses as well. The content is organized in the aphoristic sutra style, characteristic of ancient India's sutra period. The text is divided into 28 Adhyayas (chapters), with cumulative total of 973 verses. Among the surviving ancient texts of its genre, the Gautama Dharmasutra has the largest portion (16%) of sutras dedicated to government and judicial procedures, compared to Apastamba's 6%, Baudhayana's 3% and Vasishtha's 9%.

The contents of the Gautama Dharmasutra, states Daniel Ingalls, suggest that private property rights existed in ancient India, that the king had a right to collect taxes and had a duty to protect the citizens of his kingdom as well as settle disputes between them by a due process if and when these disputes emerged.

The topics of this Dharmasūtra are arranged methodically, and resembles the structure of texts found in much later Dharma-related smṛtis (traditional texts).

Gautama Dharmasutras
Chapter	Topics (incomplete)	Translation; Comments
1. Sources of Dharma; 1.1-4 / Origins and reliable sources of law
2. Brahmacharya; 1.5-1.61 / Student's code of conduct, insignia, rules of study; 2.1-2.51 / General rules, conduct towards teachers, food, graduation
3. Stages of life; 3.1-3.36 / Student, monk, anchorite; 4.1-8.25 / Household, marriage, rituals, gifts, respect for guests, behavior during times of crisis and adversity, interaction between Brahmins and the king, ethics and virtues; 9.1-9.74 / Graduates; 10.1-10.66 / Four social classes, their occupations, rules of violence during war, tax rates, proper tax spending, property rights
4. Judiciary; 11.1-11.32 / The king and his duties, judicial process; 12.1-13.31 / Criminal and civil law categories, contract and debts, theory of punishment, rules of trial, witnesses
5. Personal rituals; 14.1-14.46 / Death in a family, cremation, impurities and purification after handling corpses; 15.1-15.29 / Rites of passage for ancestors and the death of loved ones; 16.1-16.49 / Self-study of texts, recitation, annual suspension of Vedic readings; 17.1-17.38 / Food, health, prohibition on killing or harming animals to produce food; 18.1-18.23 / Marriage, remarriage, child custody disputes
6. Punishment and penances; 18.24-21.22 / Seizure of property, excommunication, expulsion, readmission, sins; 22.1-23.34 / Penances for killings animals, adultery, illicit sex, eating meat, different types of penances
7. Inheritance and conflicts within law; 28.1-28.47 / Inheritance rights of sons and daughters on man's property, on woman's property, levirate, estates, partition of property between relatives; 28.48-28.53 / Resolving disputes and doubts within law

== Commentaries ==
Duties of a graduate

He should not spend the morning, midday or afternoon fruitlessly,
but pursue righteousness, wealth and pleasure,
to the best of his ability,
but among them he should attend chiefly to righteousness.

— Gautama Dharmasutra 9.46-9.47

Maskarin and Haradatta both commented on Gautama Dharmasūtra – the oldest is by Maskarin in 900-1000 CE, before Haradatta (who also commented on Apastamba).

Olivelle states that Haradatta while writing his commentary on Gautama Dharmasutra titled Mitaksara copied freely from Maskarin's commentary. In contrast, Banerji states that Haradatta's commentary is older than Maskarin's. Asahaya may have also written a commentary on the Gautama text, but this manuscript is either lost or yet to be discovered.

== Influence ==
Daniel Ingalls, a professor of Sanskrit at the Harvard University, states that the regulations in the Gautama Dharmasutra were not laws for the entire society, but were regulations and code of conduct that were developed and applied "strictly to one small group of Brahmins". The Gautama text was part of the curriculum of one of the Samaveda schools, and most of the rules, if enforceable, states Ingall, applied to just this group.

It is quite likely, states Patrick Olivelle, that the ideas and concepts in the Gautama Dharmasutra strongly influenced the authors of the Manusmriti. Medieval texts, such as Apararka, state that thirty six Dharmasastra authors were influenced by Gautama Dharmasutras.

== See also ==
- Arthashastra
- Manusmriti
- Upanishads
- Vedas
