= Rathakara =

Rathakāra or the Chariot maker is mentioned in several Hindu scriptures such as Rigveda, Yajurveda, Atharvaveda, Saṃhitas etc. There are various types of Rathakāras mentioned in the texts, whose social status was not uniform, some enjoyed a very high status and some were degraded. Recent inscriptions found by Archeological department says Rathakaras are artisans, who were born out of Anuloma and Pratiloma.

== Inscriptions ==
Some inscriptions refers to artisans as Rathakara and are said to have been born as Anuloma and Pratiloma. Anulomas are described as those who were the sons of high caste father and a low caste mother whereas Pratilomas means the sons of low caste father and a high caste mother.

== Niṣādapati ==
The Rathakāra's ways of earning a livelihood are stated as comprising chariots, carts and the like.

== Other scriptures ==
According to some doctrines these Rathakāras have no right to take part in any of the sacrifices as they are degraded to Śudra. A Śudra is not initiated to Vedic studies hence no Upanayana, as the sacrificer has to know Vedas, hence Śudra cannot participate in any kind of Yajña. Baudhāyana on the other hand admits this degraded Rathakāra to the ceremony of Upanayana, according to him fallen Rathakāra ought to perform this ceremony the rainy season. But some text mention that even a Śudra was allowed to participate in few sacrifices, and was even entitled to perform certain sacrifices like Pākayajñas, Śradhayajñas. But they were not entitled to perform the sacrifices which were strictly vedic. Sage Jaimini mentions another Rathakāra whose social status is inferior to Vaiśya but superior to that of a Śudra, and calls them Saudhavanas.

== See also ==
- Ratha
