= Prāyaścitta =

Sanskrit word

Prāyaścitta (Sanskrit: प्रायश्चित्त) is the Sanskrit word which means "atonement, penance, expiation". In Hinduism, it is a dharma-related term and refers to voluntarily accepting one's errors and misdeeds, confession, repentance, means of penance and expiation to undo or reduce the karmic consequences. It includes atonement for intentional and unintentional misdeeds. The ancient Hindu literature on repentance, expiation and atonement is extensive, with earliest mentions found in the Vedic literature. Illustrative means to repent for intentional and unintentional misdeeds include admitting one's misdeeds, austerities, fasting, pilgrimage and bathing in sacred waters, ascetic lifestyle, yajna (fire sacrifice, homa), praying, yoga, giving gifts to the poor and needy, and others.

Those texts that discuss Prāyaścitta, states Robert Lingat, debate the intent and thought behind the improper act, and consider penance appropriate when the "effect" had to be balanced, but "cause" was unclear.

== History and meaning ==
The term Prāyaścitta, and variations such as Prāyaścitti, appear in the Vedic literature. However, in some instances such as in Taittiriya Samhita verses 2.1.2.4 and 5.1.9.3, these words simply imply "accidental happening or mishap" and associated sense of remorse, and their context has nothing to do with "sin". In other cases, such as in Taittiriya Samhita 5.3.12.1, the word Prāyaścitti appears with the meaning of expiation for a sin. The error or mistake mentioned in the ancient Hindu texts, such as the Brahmana and Aranyaka layers of Vedic texts, as well as various Sutras and Shastras, include those related to ritual procedure such as letting the altar fire go out, or unintentional breaking a cooking pot, or an intentional inappropriate conduct, and any range of events where a person feels remorseful.

A generic definition of Prāyaścitta in the Sruti texts is provided by Shabara in his commentary on Mimamsasutra 12.3.16. He states that they are of two types. One category of Prāyaścitta are those to correct anything ritual-related that emerges from one's neglect or heedlessness, while the others are atonement for "not doing what one must" or "doing what one must not".

Most sources state the word Prāyaścitta originates from Prāya and citta, which Kane states respectively mean "austerity" and "a resolve". However, some Indian scholars such as Hemadri state that Prāya implies destruction, while citta implies "joining together", or "joining together what was destroyed", making good what was lost. A third derivation for the word is in Samavidhana Brahmana, where it is composed of pra, ayah and citta, which translates to "observances after knowing a certain thing has happened". Yet a fourth definition ties it to sin, wherein it is asserted to be composed of Prayata and Cita (as in Upacita), and here it means "actions that destroy sins". A sin (pāpa) or Adharma (not dharma), is any transgression, wrongdoing, misdeed or behavior inconsistent with Dharma. The word is also used in Hindu texts to refer to actions to expiate one's errors or sins, such as adultery by a married person.

Some scholarly literature spell Prāyaścitta without diacritic as Prayascitta or Prayashchitta.

== Applicability ==
The Hindu literature on Prayaschitta is extensive, and most commonly found in the Dharma-related literature as well as the Epics and Puranas. The earliest mentions are found in the Vedas, such as in the Brahmana layer of text in the Samaveda.

The Smritis of Hinduism do not offer a consistent theory of prāyaścittas. They differ between themselves if, when and what prāyaścittas are applicable, and whether they are sufficient if the errors and sins were done intentionally or unintentionally. Furthermore, states Patrick Olivelle, the ancient and medieval manuscripts, relating to prāyaścittas, that have survived show evidence of major corruption and interpolations over their history. For instance, chapter 11 of Manusmriti starts with the assertion that it will now discuss penance (prāyaścittas), but the 43 verses that follow have nothing to do with penance, and Olivelle suggests this is evidence of later interpolated replacement.

The ancient texts suggest that there was significant debate and disagreement between Dharma scholars on what is the appropriate and sufficient penance or punishment for a given crime. For example, some texts suggest suicide as penance, or capital punishment for the crime of incest or rape, but other texts consider this as disproportionate punishment. Theft is a grave sin in these texts, but the penance prescribed vary, with some texts questioning whether food eaten by an ox, without the permission of the owner of a fodder, qualifies as a sin for the owner of that ox. Similarly, there are major disagreements and acknowledgment of controversies within the texts on when and what conduct is inappropriate, whether and what penance must follow. Similarly, the penance and atonement for sexual misconduct and adultery varies in different dharma texts.

The emphasis of the Hindu texts is on inner correction through penance, rather than imposed punishment. It is tied to the karma doctrine. Prāyaścittas, that is penance to self correct, are considered part of dharma. The Mahabharata for example, states Alf Hiltebeitel, asserts that one is not touched by adharma if one inhabits the space "where the Vedas, sacrifices (yajna), penance (prāyaścittas), truth (satya), restraint (damah), ahimsa and dharma are joined together".

=== Juvenile crimes and sins ===
Prāyaścitta in Hindu texts vary according to the age and capacity of a person. If a minor commits a sin such as drinking sura (alcohol), he does not need to perform a penance. Instead, states Brhadyama smriti, the minor's guardian such as father, elder brother, family member or relative should perform the penance. If a juvenile under the age of five commits a crime, most ancient Hindu texts do not consider it a crime, as under-5 age are deemed unable to commit a crime or sin. No penance is required, but some texts argue that this only applies to minor infractions.

The different Smriti texts vary in their recommendations on penances by ages, the definition of juvenile sins and crimes and age limit, sins and crimes by men above a certain age, women, who the sinner and the victim is, and whether the person is the sick and ailing. The intent behind the sin or crime is also a factor in these texts. The penance requirements are reduced or increased, based on the age, circumstances and intent, depending on the source.

=== Pratyāmnāyas ===
Pratyāmnāyas emerged in medieval era, as a form of penance appropriate to the age, the time and the strength of the sinner. They were asserted to be a kind of penance that purify a man without harming or causing undue distress to the sinner.

== Practice ==
Sin and penance

A man or woman who raises his/her hand should perform an arduous penance,
if she or he strikes, she or he should perform the very arduous penance,
and if he/she draws blood, he/she should perform both arduous and lunary penance;
Therefore, a woman or man should neither raise hand nor draw blood.

— Sri Sri Ravishankar 2.1.17

The Dharmasastras list many types of Prāyaścitta or penance. These include:

- Abhiśasta (public confession): a person visits homes as a beggar, seeks forgiveness, confesses his crime and asks for food.
- Anutāpa (repentance): a person loathes the evil he did, reminds and repeats to himself "I shall not do that again".
- Prāṇāyāma (restraint of breath): a person does breath control exercises similar to yoga.
- Tapas: a person performs austerity such as celibacy, wearing wet clothes till they dry on his body, sleeping on ground or fasting.
- Homa: a fire sacrifice accompanied with kusmanda mantras.
- Japa: reciting Vedic prayers, either audibly, inaudibly or mentally.
- Dāna: giving away gifts such as cow, horse, land, butter, sesame seeds and food to the needy.
- Upavāsa or Vratas: restricting one's diet, such as by eating bland foods or small quantity as a self reminder of penance, sometimes with vows.
- Tirtha (pilgrimages): going on foot to distant pilgrimage sites, or to bathe in holy rivers.

Upavasa (restricting diet or fasting) and Vrata (with vow) are the most common form of penance prescribed in Dharma texts of Hinduism.

=== Pilgrimages ===
Pilgrimages (tīrthayātrā) to a tīrtha, or holy place, are a type of prāyaścitta. Pilgrimages are not prominent in Dharmasastras such as Manusmriti and Yajnavalkya Smriti, but they are also found in the epic Mahabharata and the Puranas. Most Puranas include large sections on Tirtha Mahatmya along with tourist guides, particularly the Padma Purana, Skanda Purana, Vayu Purana, Kurma Purana, Bhagavata Purana, Narada Purana, and Bhavishya Purana.

The Vishnu Dharmasastra asserts that the type of sin that may be expiated through pilgrimages is referred to as anupātakas (small sin), in contrast to mahapātakas (major sin) that require other penances. According to Kane, many texts asserted that "tirtha-yatra (journey to a holy place) was a popular way for redemption of sins in the case of all classes of men and women. The texts assert that the man should take his wife with him, when proceeding to pilgrimage. However, some smṛtis also call attention to the fact that doing one's duty as a householder is more important than going on pilgrimages, and it is only in special cases or once one has paid his Three Debts (to his parents, his teacher, and the Vedas) that he should resort to pilgrimages.

Tirtha: Holy Pilgrimage

Tirtha are of three kinds,
Jangam Tirtha is to a place movable,
of a sadhu, a rishi, a guru,
Sthawar Tirtha is to a place immovable,
like Benaras, Hardwar, Mount Kailash, holy rivers,
Manas Tirtha is to a place of mind,
of truth, charity, patience, compassion, soft speech, soul.

—Skanda Purana

The proper procedure for a pilgrimage is debated within the smṛtis, with questions such as whether one should cut his hair before a pilgrimage arising or whether a fast at the tīrtha is required. The mode of travel is also widely discussed, as to whether one may reap any benefit from traveling in a conveyance. The most widely accepted view appears to be that the greatest austerity (prāyaścitta) comes from traveling on foot, and that the use of a conveyance is only acceptable if the pilgrimage is otherwise impossible. Raghunanda's Prāyaścitta-tattva asserts that the person seeking penance must give up 16 things when he reaches the Ganges river, including behavior such as praising another tirtha, striking anyone, sexual dalliance, accepting gifts and giving one's used clothing as gifts to others.

=== Vratas ===
The concept of vratas date back to the Ṛgveda, and it refers to self-imposed restrictions on food and behavior, sometimes with a vow. A Vrata may be motivated by many factors, one of which may be expiatory (prāyaścitta). A Vrata can also be non-penance related voluntary vow or part of practice by a brahmacharya (student) or grihastha (householders) that they feel as obligatory before or during certain spiritual or religious practice. Utsavas, or religious festivals, share some elements with vratas. They may contain elements of are often difficult to distinguish from the practice of vratas.

Vratas are discussed as a means to prāyaścitta in Dharmasastra texts. Many prāyaścitta vratas in these texts suggest it include the feeding of "Brahmins, blind, poor and helpless", as well as other acts of charity. However, a Vrata can consist of many different activities. Other examples of Vrata activity include fasting, burning incense sticks, prayers before a deity, meditating and such activities. The śmrtis go into great detail on the subject of vratas, discussing even the details pertaining to what type of flowers should be used in worship.

Men and women, state the Dharmashastras and the Puranas, can expiate their sins through the use of vratas. For prāyaścitta, the Vratas are the second most discussed method in the Puranas, after the Tirtha.

=== Śāntis ===
Śāntis are rites a person undertakes to come to terms or create peace with fears, doubts, portents or omens. These include anxiety in an expectant mother, sounds or sights or dreams a person considers unlucky and others. Some texts, such as the Kaushikasutra state that some Shanti rites are also a form of prāyaścitta. The Atharvaveda has sections on such rites and rituals.

=== Repentance ===
The Hindu Dharma texts such as Manusmriti assert Anutapa, or repentance to be an important form of prāyaścitta. Acknowledgment of an unjust act is considered a step towards inner reformation and the start of a purge of the effects of immorality. The texts recommend remorse and repentance to be accompanied with austerity and reflection, as well as study to gain jnana (knowledge) for redemption and return to a dharmic life. The term Anutapa (literally, "following heat") is related to Paścatāpa (literally, sorrow, regret).

== Procedures for penance ==
Laugākṣigṛha proscribes the procedures for all penances, while others, like the Śankha and Madanapārijāta also provide elaborate rules about undergoing procedures of prayascittas." Some particular procedures a sinner must undergo include: paring of nails, shaving his head, bathing with clay, cow dung, and holy water, drinking clarified butter, and making a declaration of performing the penance indicated by the assembly of the learned male Brahmins, all on the day prior to commencing his penance. On the next day, he is to bathe, perform Śrãddha and Homa, and give gifts to the Brahmins and feed them. Also during the time of prāyaścitta, the sinner must observe certain rules on food and other matters. This includes that the sinner refrain from taking food at another's house, from sexual intercourse, from speaking at an improper time, and from everything that might cause him to feel strength or sexual passion. It is customary that when undergoing a penance, the sinner begins with a mantra that translates "O! Fire, lord of vrata! I shall perform a vrata." In the same way, when one has finished his penance, he recites a mantra that translates, "O! Fire, lord of vratas: I have performed the vrata, I had the strength to do it, may it be propitious for me!" There are also particular virtues that should be practiced while doing penance such as honesty. These are known as yamas.

Two kinds of Prāyaścitta exist: one which is done openly, prakāś, and one which is done secretly, rahasya. Many smṛtis lay down rules about performing secret prāyaścittas. One reason a man would perform a secret prāyaścitta is because no one but himself knows about the sin he has committed. A general rule exists that secret penances are meant for those who have consecrated the Vedic fires, who are disciplined, old or learned, and that the open penances are meant for other people. It is even said that women and śūdras can perform secret penances because they too can give gifts and prāṇāyāmas.

While some smṛtis prescribe the enactment of a penance immediately as needed, some other place restrictions on the time (i.e. the Prāyaścittattatva says that a penance should not commence on the 8th or 14th tithi of the month). If one is in mourning, he may also wait to perform penance until the period of mourning has been completed.

== Overlap with Vyavahāra ==
Prāyaścitta is one of three sections that traditionally compose the Dharmashastras, the other two being ācāra and vyavahāra.

Vyavahāra, technically refers to the process, procedure, and administration of justice. If convicted, some sins and crimes were specified to invite penance, while others merited punishment (danda). Intentional murder, for instance, was specified to have the punishment of death. This punishment is counted both in a legal sense and as part of the prāyaścitta section. This combining of penance with legal procedure appears to make the prāyaścitta more effective as penance ending in death can result in full expiation from intentional sins. Some text impose a time scale, wherein prāyaścitta increases the longer the crime or sin goes uncorrected.
