= Vīramitrodaya =

The Vīramitrodaya refers to a Hindu law digest written by Mitra Miśra, a brahmin from Gopācala (present day Gwalior) which covers nearly every aspect of Dharmaśāstra. The work was done at the behest of King Vīrasimhadeva of Orchha during the reign of Akbar. The Privy Council recorded the text to be a work of high authority regarding Hindu law, revered throughout North India. Mitamiśra's text includes hundreds of citations from many Hindu religious texts (a large volume of which are either lost or remain unpublished) in which he analyzes and critiques numerous arguments, following which he puts forward his own opinions. The same title is also applied to a commentary of the Yājñavalkyasmṛti also written by the same person.

== Text ==
The nibandha titled Viramitrodaya is composed of 22 sections, called prakāśas. The following 12 are available in printed form

● Paribhāṣā-prakāśa - deals with etymology (similar to Etymologiea)

● Saṃskāra-prakāśa - deals with rites of passage

● Āhnika-prakāśa - deals with rites to be performed daily (like bathing, sandhyāvandanā, tarpaṇa etc)

● Pūjā-prakāśa - deals with rites of pūjā

● Lakṣaṇa-prakāśa - deals with physiognomy (similar to Physiognomonics)

● Rājanīti-prakāśa - deals with rites & duties related to royalty (like enthronement, issuing edicts, consecrating royal seal, securing victory, maintaining sovereignty etc) alongside division of power & criminal laws as espoused in śāstras.

● Tīrtha-prakāśa - deals with rites of pilgrimage

● Vyavahāra-prakāśa - deals with judicial procedure as espoused in śāstras

● Śrāddha-prakāśa - deals with rites of śrāddha

● Samaya-prakāśa - deals with rites related to observance of festivities

● Bhakti-prakāśa - deals with the concept of bhakti

● Śuddhi-prakāśa - deals with ritual pollution & rites to cleanse them (not to be confused with the similar concept introduced much later)

The following 10 haven't been printed yet

● Pratiṣṭhā-prakāśa - deals with rites related to consecration of artificial structures like houses, roads, temples, forts, idols of deities, waterbodies etc

● Dāna-prakāśa - deals with rites of charity

● Vrata-prakāśa - deals with rites of observing holy vows

● Jyotiśa-prakāśa - deals with time-keeping & astrology

● Śānti-prakāśa - deals with rites of pacification

● Karmavipāka-prakāśa - deals with the rites related to karmavipāka (Hindu theory to explain how people can be afflicted in the form of misfortune & diseases without any apparent reason due to bad deeds performed in past lives)

● Cikitsā-prakāśa - deals with rites aimed at curing diseases

● Prāyaścitta-prakāśa - deals with rites of penitence

● Mokṣa-prakāśa - deals with the concept of mokṣa

● Prakīrṇaka-prakāśa - deals with miscellaneous topics not discussed in the preceding works

=== Vyavahāra ===
- The Vyavahāra-Prakāśa is considered to be the largest nibandha, or digest written on the Vyavahāra
- The text is divided into four parts:

==== 1.) Composition of the Court ====
- Constitution of the sabhā
- The Appointment of judges
- Conflict with the Dharmaśāstra
- Various grades of the courts
- Burden and means of proof

==== 2.) Modes of Proof ====
- Witnesses
- Documents

==== 3.) 18 Titles of Law ====
1. the first is the non-payment of debts
2. deposits
3. sale without ownership
4. partnerships
5. delivery and non-delivery of gifts
6. non-payment of wages
7. breach of contract
8. cancellation of a sale or purchase
9. disputes between owners and herdsman
10. the Law on boundary disputes
11. verbal assault
12. physical assault
13. theft
14. violence
15. sexual crimes against women
16. Law concerning husband and wife
17. partition of inheritance
18. gambling and betting

=== Samskāra ===
- Astrological matters relating to marriage

=== Rājanti ===
- The qualifications of ministers
- Preparing for battle
- Routine for kings
- Time and procedure for coronation

=== Āhnika ===
- The daily duties to be done when rising and before going to bed.

=== Pūjā ===
- Those entitled to perform worship of the gods
- Proper flowers and clothing for worship

=== Tirtha ===
- Discuss those able to undertake a pilgrimage
- Times for a pilgrimage
- Ceremonial acts to be done for men, such as bathing, fasting and shaving.

=== Laksana ===
- The human body
- Qualities needed for the queen, ministers, astrologers, and physicians.
