= Swami Bodhayan Mandir =

Birth Place of the mathematician Baudhāyana

Coordinates: 26.5367°N 85.6181°E

Baudhāyana Peeth
- बौधायन पीठ
- Interactive map of Baudhāyana Peeth

Monastery information
- Full name: Tapobhoomi of Bodhayansar
- Other name: Baudhāyana Ashram
- Established: 700 BC
- Dedication: Baudhāyana Sūtras

People
- Founder: Baudhāyana
- Important associated figures: Baudhāyana, Panini, Saurbhaum Vasudevacharya

Architecture
- Heritage designation: Academy of Vedic sage Baudhāyana

Swami Bodhayan Mandir
- स्वामी बौधायन मंदिर

Religion
- Affiliation: Hinduism
- District: Sitamarhi district
- Deity: Bhagwan Bodhayan
- Festivals: Bhagwan Bodhayan Jayanti, Guru Poornima
- Features: Temple tree: Banyan

Location
- Location: Bangaon Village, Bajpatti Block, Sitamarhi
- State: Mithila region, Bihar
- Country: India
- Interactive map of Swami Bodhayan Mandir

Architecture
- Founder: Devhara Baba, Saurbhaum Vasudevacharya
- Established: 1956
- Completed: 1958

Swami Bodhayan Mandir (Sanskrit: स्वामी बौधायन मंदिर) is a Hindu temple in Bongaon village, Bajpatti block, Sitamarhi district, Bihar, India, which is said to be the birthplace of the Vedic sage, Bodhayan, who created the Baudhayana sutras.

== History ==
The foundation of the temple was laid by Devraha Baba in 1956. A lake, named Baudhayan Sarovar, was also constructed near the temple. The place was identified as the birthplace of Bhagwan Bodhayan by the Sanskrit scholar Sarvabhaum Vasudevacharya.

== Description ==
The landlords of the village donated 25 acres of land to this temple. There is a very old giant Banyan tree. The Banyan tree is considered the seat of penance for Bodhayan. The tree is known as Bodhayansar. The location of the temple is also known as Bodhayana Tapobhumi. Inside the temple, the idol of Bhagwan Bodhayan and outside the temple, an idol of Sarvabhaum Vasudevacharya was installed. The present priest of the temple is Acharya Shivam Das.

The premises of the temple holds a Gurukul for learning Sanskrit and Vedic scriptures.
