= Manava =

Indian mathematician (c. 750 – 690 BC)

Manava (c. 750 BC – 690 BC) is an author of the Hindu geometric text of Sulba Sutras.

The Manava Sulbasutra is not the oldest (the one by Baudhayana is older), nor is it one of the most important, there being at least three Sulbasutras which are considered more important. Historians place his lifetime at around 750 BC.

Manava would have not have been a mathematician in the sense that we would understand it today. Nor was he a scribe who simply copied manuscripts like Ahmes. He would certainly have been a man of very considerable learning but probably not interested in mathematics for its own sake, merely interested in using it for religious purposes. Undoubtedly he wrote the Sulbasutra to provide rules for religious rites and it would appear almost a certainty that Manava himself would be a Hindu priest.

The mathematics given in the Sulbasutras is there to enable accurate construction of altars needed for sacrifices. It is clear from the writing that Manava, as well as being a priest, must have been a skilled craftsman.

Manava's Sulbasutra, like all the Sulbasutras, contained approximate constructions of circles from rectangles, and squares from circles, which can be thought of as giving approximate values of π. There appear therefore different values of π throughout the Sulbasutra, essentially every construction involving circles leads to a different such approximation. The paper of R.C. Gupta is concerned with an interpretation of verses 11.14 and 11.15 of Manava's work which give π = 25/8 = 3.125.
