= Shulba Sutras =

Texts belonging to the Śrauta ritual

The Shulva Sutras or Śulbasūtras (Sanskrit: शुल्बसूत्र; śulba: "string, cord, rope") are sutra texts belonging to the Śrauta ritual and containing geometry related to fire-altar construction.

== Purpose and origins ==
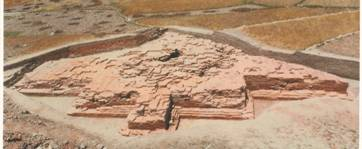
Falcon-shaped vedi excavated from Purola, Uttarkashi; likely belonging to the Kuninda period (150 BCE - 250 CE).

Transforming a square into a circle (of the same area), as suggested by Bodhāyana, in a text contained in the Śulba Sūtras.

The Shulba Sutras are part of the larger corpus of texts called the Shrauta Sutras, considered to be appendices to the Vedas. They are the only sources of knowledge of Indian mathematics from the Vedic period. Unique Vedi (fire-altar) shapes were associated with unique gifts from the Gods. For instance, "he who desires heaven is to construct a fire-altar in the form of a falcon"; "a fire-altar in the form of a tortoise is to be constructed by one desiring to win the world of Brahman" and "those who wish to destroy existing and future enemies should construct a fire-altar in the form of a rhombus".

The four major Shulba Sutras, which are mathematically the most significant, are those attributed to Baudhayana, Manava, Apastamba and Katyayana. Their language is late Vedic Sanskrit, pointing to a composition roughly during the 1st millennium BCE. The oldest is the sutra attributed to (Baudhayana, Manava and Apstambha)possibly compiled around 800 BCE to 500 BCE. Pingree says that the Apastamba is likely the next oldest; he places the Katyayana and the Manava third and fourth chronologically, on the basis of apparent borrowings. According to mathematical historian Kim Plofker, the Katyayana was composed after "the great grammatical codification of Sanskrit by Pāṇini in probably the mid-fourth century BCE", but she places the Manava in the same period as the Baudhayana.

With regard to the composition of Vedic texts, Plofker writes,

The Vedic veneration of Sanskrit as a sacred speech, whose divinely revealed texts were meant to be recited, heard, and memorized rather than transmitted in writing, helped shape Sanskrit literature in general. ... Thus texts were composed in formats that could be easily memorized: either condensed prose aphorisms (sūtras, a word later applied to mean a rule or algorithm in general) or verse, particularly in the Classical period. Naturally, ease of memorization sometimes interfered with ease of comprehension. As a result, most treatises were supplemented by one or more prose commentaries ..."

There are multiple commentaries for each of the Shulba Sutras, but these were written long after the original works. The commentary of Sundararāja on the Apastamba, for example, comes from the late 15th century CE and the commentary of Dvārakãnātha on the Baudhayana appears to borrow from Sundararāja. According to philosopher Frits Staal, certain aspects of the tradition described in the Shulba Sutras would have been "transmitted orally", and he points to places in southern India where the fire-altar ritual is still practiced and an oral tradition preserved. The fire-altar tradition largely died out in India, however, and Plofker warns that those pockets where the practice remains may reflect a later Vedic revival rather than an unbroken tradition. Archaeological evidence of the altar constructions described in the Shulba Sutras is sparse. A large falcon-shaped fire altar (śyenaciti), dating to the second century BCE, was found in the, 1957-59, excavations by G. R. Sharma at Kausambi, but this altar does not conform to the dimensions prescribed by the Shulba Sutras.

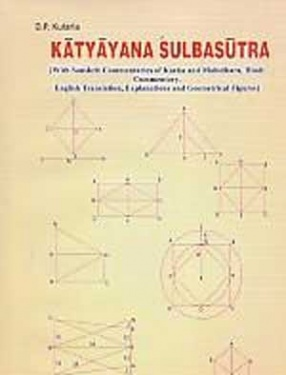
Cover page of a treaty of Śulbasūtra by the Indian mathematician Kātyāyana around the 2nd century BCE.

The content of the Shulba Sutras is likely older than the works themselves. The Satapatha Brahmana and the Taittiriya Samhita, whose contents date to the late second millennium or early first millennium BCE, describe altars whose dimensions appear to be based on the right triangle with legs of 15 pada and 36 pada, one of the triangles listed in the Baudhayana Shulba Sutra.

The origin of the mathematics in the Shulba Sutras is not known. It is possible, as proposed by mathematical historian Radha Charan Gupta, that the geometry was developed to meet the needs of ritual. Some scholars go farther: Staal hypothesizes a common ritual origin for Indian and Greek geometry, citing similar interest and approach to doubling and other geometric transformation problems. Abraham Seidenberg, followed by Bartel Leendert van der Waerden, sees a ritual origin for mathematics more broadly, postulating that the major advances, such as discovery of the Pythagorean theorem, occurred in only one place, and diffused from there to the rest of the world. Van der Waerden mentions that the author of Shulba sutras existed before 600 BCE and could not have been influenced by Greek geometry. While historian Carl Benjamin Boyer mentions Old Babylonian mathematics (c. 2000 BCE–1600 BCE) as a possible origin, the c. 1800 BCE Plimpton 322 tablet containing a table of triplets, however also states that Shulba sutras contain a formula not found in Babylon sources. Seidenberg argues that either "Old Babylonia got the theorem of Pythagoras from India or that Old Babylonia and India got it from a third source". Seidenberg suggests that this source might be Sumerian and may predate 1700 BC. In contrast, Pingree cautions that "it would be a mistake to see in [the altar builders'] works the unique origin of geometry; others in India and elsewhere, whether in response to practical or theoretical problems, may well have advanced as far without their solutions having been committed to memory or eventually transcribed in manuscripts." Plofker also raises the possibility that "existing geometric knowledge [was] consciously incorporated into ritual practice".

== List of Shulba Sutras ==
1. Apastamba
2. Baudhayana
3. Manava
4. Katyayana
5. Maitrayaniya (somewhat similar to Manava text)
6. Varaha (in manuscript)
7. Vadhula (in manuscript)
8. Hiranyakeshin (similar to Apastamba Shulba Sutras)

== Mathematics ==
=== Pythagorean theorem and Pythagorean triples ===
The sutras contain statements of the Pythagorean theorem, both in the case of an isosceles right triangle and in the general case, as well as lists of Pythagorean triples. In Baudhayana, for example, the rules are given as follows:

1.9. The diagonal of a square produces double the area [of the square].
[...]
1.12. The areas [of the squares] produced separately by the lengths and the breadth of a rectangle together equal the area [of the square] produced by the diagonal.
1.13. This is observed in rectangles having sides 3 and 4, 12 and 5, 15 and 8, 7 and 24, 12 and 35, 15 and 36.

Similarly, Apastamba's rules for constructing right angles in fire-altars use the following Pythagorean triples:

- $(3, 4, 5)$
- $(5, 12, 13)$
- $(8, 15, 17)$
- $(12, 35, 37)$

In addition, the sutras describe procedures for constructing a square with area equal either to the sum or to the difference of two given squares. Both constructions proceed by letting the largest of the squares be the square on the diagonal of a rectangle, and letting the two smaller squares be the squares on the sides of that rectangle. The assertion that each procedure produces a square of the desired area is equivalent to the statement of the Pythagorean theorem. Another construction produces a square with area equal to that of a given rectangle. The procedure is to cut a rectangular piece from the end of the rectangle and to paste it to the side so as to form a gnomon of area equal to the original rectangle. Since a gnomon is the difference of two squares, the problem can be completed using one of the previous constructions.

=== Geometry ===
The Baudhayana Shulba sutra gives the construction of geometric shapes such as squares and rectangles. It also gives, sometimes approximate, geometric area-preserving transformations from one geometric shape to another. These include transforming a square into a rectangle, an isosceles trapezium, an isosceles triangle, a rhombus, and a circle, and transforming a circle into a square. In these texts approximations, such as the transformation of a circle into a square, appear side by side with more accurate statements. As an example, the statement of circling the square is given in Baudhayana as:

2.9. If it is desired to transform a square into a circle, [a cord of length] half the diagonal [of the square] is stretched from the centre to the east [a part of it lying outside the eastern side of the square]; with one-third [of the part lying outside] added to the remainder [of the half diagonal], the [required] circle is drawn.

and the statement of squaring the circle is given as:

2.10. To transform a circle into a square, the diameter is divided into eight parts; one [such] part after being divided into twenty-nine parts is reduced by twenty-eight of them and further by the sixth [of the part left] less the eighth [of the sixth part].
2.11. Alternatively, divide [the diameter] into fifteen parts and reduce it by two of them; this gives the approximate side of the square [desired].

The constructions in 2.9 and 2.10 give a value of π as 3.088, while the construction in 2.11 gives π as 3.004.

=== Square roots ===
Altar construction also led to an estimation of the square root of 2 as found in three of the sutras. In the Baudhayana sutra it appears as:

2.12. The measure is to be increased by its third and this [third] again by its own fourth less the thirty-fourth part [of that fourth]; this is [the value of] the diagonal of a square [whose side is the measure].

which leads to the value of the square root of two as being:

$\sqrt{2} \approx 1 + \frac{1}{3} + \frac{1}{3 \cdot 4} - \frac{1}{3 \cdot4 \cdot 34} = \frac{577}{408} = 1.4142...$

Indeed, an early method for calculating square roots can be found in some Sutras, the method involves the recursive formula: $\sqrt{x} \approx \sqrt{x-1} + \frac{1}{2 \cdot \sqrt{x-1}}$ for large values of x, which bases itself on the non-recursive identity $\sqrt{a ^2+ r} \approx a + \frac{r}{2 \cdot a}$ for values of r extremely small relative to a.

It has also been suggested, for example by Bürk that this approximation of √2 implies knowledge that √2 is irrational. In his translation of Euclid's Elements, Heath outlines a number of milestones necessary for irrationality to be considered to have been discovered, and points out the lack of evidence that Indian mathematics had achieved those milestones in the era of the Shulba Sutras.

== See also ==
- Kalpa (Vedanga)

== Translations ==
- "The Śulvasútra of Baudháyana, with the commentary by Dvárakánáthayajvan", by George Thibaut, was published in a series of issues of The Pandit. A Monthly Journal, of the Benares College, devoted to Sanskrit Literature. Note that the commentary is left untranslated.
  - (1875) 9 (108): 292–298
  - (1875–1876) 10 (109): 17–22, (110): 44–50, (111): 72–74, (114): 139–146, (115): 166–170, (116): 186–194, (117): 209–218
  - (new series) (1876–1877) 1 (5): 316–322, (9): 556–578, (10): 626–642, (11): 692–706, (12): 761–770
- "Kátyáyana's Śulbapariśishta with the Commentary by Ráma, Son of Súryadása", by George Thibaut, was published in a series of issues of The Pandit. A Monthly Journal, of the Benares College, devoted to Sanskrit Literature. Note that the commentary is left untranslated.
  - (new series) (1882) 4 (1–4): 94–103, (5–8): 328–339, (9–10): 382–389, (9–10): 487–491
- Bürk, Albert (1902). "Das Āpastamba-Śulba-Sūtra, herausgegeben, übersetzt und mit einer Einleitung versehen". Zeitschrift der Deutschen Morgenländischen Gesellschaft (in German). 56: 327–391. Transcription and analysis in Bürk (1901).
- Sen, S.N.; Bag, A.K. (1983). The Śulba Sūtras of Baudhāyana, Āpastamba, Kātyāyana and Mānava with Text, English Translation and Commentary. New Delhi: Indian National Science Academy.
