= Bhāruci =

Bhāruci's commentary (bhashya) on the Manu Smrti, or Laws of Manu, is part of the corpus of Dharmaśāstra texts available to us today. It is the oldest commentary on Manu that we know of, and is one of the sources used by Medhātithi, another major commentator on the Manu Smṛti.

== Dating and historical context ==
Very little is known about the date or historical context in which Bhāruci was writing, but P. V. Kane argues that it cannot have been written after 1050 CE because Vijñāneśvara, the author of the Mitākṣarā, a famous commentary on the Yājñavalkya Smṛti, mentions Bhāruci's commentary in his writing. Viśvarūpa, another commentator on the Yājñavalka Smṛti, also uses Bhāruci as a source. Patrick Olivelle places Bhāruci in the 8th century CE, while J. Duncan M. Derrett places him between 600 and 650 CE. There are two known authors named Bhāruci placed in about the same period of time, one who wrote on Dharmaśāstra and one who was a jurist, and Kane posits that they were in fact the same person because it is unlikely that there were two famous writers with the same name writing at the same time.

== Topics ==
The main content of Bhāruci's commentary deals with the duties of a king, particularly regarding whether or not the king can be a source of dharma. Bhāruci's view as discussed by Derrett was that the king did not have any legislative power, but he did have "the power to issue regulations and edicts of a temporary character or for the purpose of facilitating objects already inculcated by the dharmaśāstra." Kane agrees, stating that "the king is not the source of the rules of Dharma, but it is śāstra that defines the rules binding on the different varnas (classes) and ashramas (stages of man's life)."
