= Anuloma =

Anuloma is a Sanskrit term that is used in the Manusmriti, that is the Laws of Manu (Shraddhadeva Manu), to describe a hypergamous union between a high born man and a woman of a lower standing (by birth) relative to the respective man. Manu explains that the evolution of different castes among mankind occurred due to the union of two persons who did not belong to the same rung in the caste or class ladder (by birth and not wealth or status in society) relative to each other. According to Manu, marriage within the same caste, that is, between two persons who belong to the same rung in the ladder, is excellent. Anuloma marriages are considered as "going with the grain" unions. As per Hindu scriptures, Anuloma marriages or unions are not advocated but were tolerated and accepted historically.

On the other hand, the reverse union called Pratiloma marriages, where a high born woman unites with a man of low birth (relative to the woman) was condemned. Manu bitterly criticises and condemns these unions which were considered as "going against the hair or grain" and holds them responsible for the degeneration of the parties involved, subsequent to the union. However, later commentators have come to accept these marriages.
