= Manusmriti =

Ancient Hindu text

The Manusmṛti (Sanskrit: मनुस्मृति), also known as the Mānava-Dharmaśāstra or the Laws of Manu, is a major legal text among the many Dharmaśāstras of Hinduism. It contains rules on many aspects of dharma and is especially famous for its discussion of different rules for the four varnas (inherited social classes, often called caste).

Over fifty manuscripts of the Manusmriti are now known, but the earliest discovered, most translated, and presumed authentic version since the 18th century is the "Kolkata (formerly Calcutta) manuscript with Kulluka Bhatta commentary". Modern scholarship states this presumed authenticity is false, and that the various manuscripts of Manusmriti discovered in India are inconsistent with each other.

The metrical text is in Sanskrit, is dated to the 2nd century BCE to 2nd century CE, and presents itself as a discourse given by Manu (Svayambhuva) and Bhrigu on dharma topics such as duties, rights, laws, conduct, varna, gender norms, and virtues. The text's influence had historically spread outside India, influencing Hindu kingdoms in what are now Cambodia and Indonesia.

In 1776, Manusmriti became one of the first Sanskrit texts to be translated into English (the original Sanskrit book was never found), by British philologist Sir William Jones. Manusmriti was used to construct the Hindu law code for the East India Company-administered enclaves. In modern times, the text is controversial due to its commentary on women and lower castes.

== Nomenclature ==
The title Manusmriti is a relatively modern term and a late innovation, probably coined because the text is in a verse form. The over-fifty manuscripts discovered of the text never use this title, but state the title as Manava Dharmashastra (Sanskrit: मानव धर्मशास्त्र) in their colophons at the end of each chapter. In modern scholarship, these two titles refer to the same text.

== Chronology ==
Philologists Jones and Karl Wilhelm Friedrich Schlegel, in the 18th century, dated Manusmriti to around 1250 BCE and 1000 BCE respectively, which, from later linguistic developments, is untenable due to the language of the text which must be later than the late Vedic texts such as the Upanishads, themselves dated a few centuries later, around 500 BCE. Later scholars shifted the chronology of the text to between the 1st or 2nd century CE. Olivelle adds that numismatic evidence and the mention of gold coins as a fine suggest the text may date to the 2nd or 3rd century CE. However, the majority of scholars agree that it was composed sometime between 200 BCE and 200 CE.

Most scholars consider the text a composite produced by many authors put together over a long period. Olivelle states that the various ancient and medieval Indian texts claim revisions and editions were derived from the original text with 100,000 verses and 1,080 chapters. However, the text version in modern use, according to Olivelle, is likely the work of a single author or a chairman with research assistants.

Manusmriti, Olivelle states, was not a new document - it drew on other texts, and reflects "a crystallization of an accumulated knowledge" in ancient India. The root of theoretical models within Manusmriti rely on at least two shastras that pre-date it: artha (statecraft and legal process) and dharma (an ancient Indian concept that includes duties, rights, laws, conduct, virtues and others discussed in various Dharmasutras, older than Manusmriti). Its contents can be traced to Kalpasutras of the Vedic era, which led to the development of Smartasutras consisting of Grihyasutras and Dharmasutras. The foundational texts of Manusmriti include many of these sutras, all from an era preceding the common era. Most of these ancient texts are now lost, and only four have survived: the law codes of Apastamba, Gautama, Baudhayana and Vasishtha.

== Structure ==
The ancient version of the text has been subdivided into twelve Adhyayas (chapters), but the original text had no such division. The text covers different topics, and is unique among ancient Indian texts in using "transitional verses" to mark the end of one subject and the start of the next. The text can be broadly divided into four, each of different length. and each further divided into subsections:

1. Creation of the world
2. Source of dharma
3. The dharma of the four social classes
4. Law of karma, rebirth and final liberation

The text is composed in metric Shlokas (verses), in the form of a dialogue between an exalted teacher and disciples who are eager to learn about the various aspects of dharma. The first 58 verses are attributed by the text to Manu, while the remaining more than two thousand verses are attributed to his student Bhrigu. Olivelle lists the subsections as follows:

=== Sources of the law ===
The Dharmasya Yonih (Sources of the Law) has twenty-four verses and one transition verse. These verses state what the text considers as the proper and just sources of law:

वेदोऽखिलो धर्ममूलं स्मृतिशीले च तद्विदाम् । आचारश्चैव साधूनामात्मनस्तुष्टिरेव च ॥

Translation 1: The whole Veda is the (first) source of the sacred law, next the tradition and the virtuous conduct of those who know the (Veda further), also the customs of holy men, and (finally) self-satisfaction (Atmana santushti).
Translation 2: The root of the dharma is the entire Veda, and (then) the tradition and customs of those who know (the Veda), and the conduct of virtuous people, and what is satisfactory to oneself.

— Manusmriti 2.6

वेदः स्मृतिः सदाचारः स्वस्य च प्रियमात्मनः । एतच्चतुर्विधं प्राहुः साक्षाद् धर्मस्य लक्षणम् ॥

Translation 1: The Veda, the sacred tradition, the customs of virtuous men, and one's own pleasure, they declare to be the fourfold means of defining the sacred law.
Translation 2: The Veda, tradition, the conduct of good people, and what is pleasing to oneself – they say that is four-fold mark of dharma.

— Manusmriti 2.12

This section of Manusmriti, like other Hindu law texts, includes fourfold sources of Dharma, states Levinson, which include Atmana santushti (satisfaction of one's conscience), Sadachara (local norms of virtuous individuals), Smriti and Sruti.

=== Dharma of the four Varnas ===
- 3.1 Rules Relating to Law (2.25 – 10.131)
  - 3.1.1 Rules of Action in Normal Times (2.26 – 9.336)
    - 3.1.1.1 Fourfold Dharma of a Brahmin (2.26 – 6.96) (contains the longest section of Manusmriti, 3.1, called dharmavidhi)
    - 3.1.1.2 Rules of Action for a King (7.1 – 9.324) (contains 960 verses, includes description of institutions and officials of state, how officials are to be appointed, tax laws, rules of war, the role and limits on the power of the king, and long sections on eighteen grounds for litigation, including those related to non-delivery under contract, breach of contract, non-payment of wages, property disputes, inheritance disputes, humiliation and defamation, physical assault, theft, violence of any form, injury, sexual crimes against women, public safety, and others; the section also includes rules of evidence, rules on interrogation of witnesses, and the organisation of court system)
    - 3.1.1.3 Rules of Action for Vaiśyas and Śūdras (9.326 – 9.335) (shortest section, eight rules for Vaishyas, two for Shudras, but some applicable laws to these two classes are discussed generically in verses 2.26 – 9.324)
  - 3.1.2 Rules of Action in Times of Adversity (10.1 – 11.129) (contains revised rules on the state machinery and four varnas in the times of war, famine or other emergencies)
- 3.2 Rules Relating to Penance (11.1 – 11.265) (includes rules of proportionate punishment; instead of fines, incarceration or death, discusses penance or social isolation as a form of punishment for certain crimes)

The verses 6.97, 9.325, 9.336 and 10.131 are transitional verses. Olivelle notes instances of likely interpolation and insertions in the notes to this section, in both the presumed vulgate version and the critical edition.

=== Determination of Karmayoga ===
The verses 12.1, 12.2 and 12.82 are transitional verses. This section is in a different style than the rest of the text, raising questions of whether this entire chapter was added later. While there is evidence that this chapter was extensively redacted over time, it is unclear whether the entire chapter is of a later era.

- 4.1 Fruits of Action (12.3–81) (section on actions and consequences, personal responsibility, action as a means of moksha – the highest personal bliss)
- 4.2 Rules of Action for Supreme Good (12.83–115) (section on karma, duties and responsibilities as a means of supreme good)

The closing verses of Manusmriti declare,

एवं यः सर्वभूतेषु पश्यत्यात्मानमात्मना । स सर्वसमतामेत्य ब्रह्माभ्येति परं पदम् ॥
He who thus recognizes in his individual soul (Self, Atman), the universal soul that exists in all beings,
becomes equal-minded towards all, and enters the highest state, Brahman.

— Manusmriti 12.125, Calcutta manuscript with Kulluka Bhatta commentary

== Audience ==
The structure and contents of the Manusmriti suggest it to be a document predominantly targeted at the Brahmins (priestly class) and the Kshatriyas (king, administration and warrior class). The text dedicates 1,034 verses, the largest portion, on laws for and expected virtues of Brahmins, and 971 verses for Kshatriyas. The statement of rules for the Vaishyas (merchant class) and the Shudras (artisans and working class) in the text is extraordinarily brief. Olivelle suggests that this may be because the text was composed to address the balance "between the political power and the priestly interests", and because of the rise in foreign invasions of India in the period it was composed.

The text is written from a male perspective and generally assumes the reader to be male.

== Teachings of Manusmriti ==
=== On personal choices, behaviours and morals ===
Manusmriti instructs on the duties (dharma) a person has towards himself and to others, including moral codes as well as legal codes. Some of the legal codes apply to situations that come from immorality. Olivelle states that this is similar to modern opposition to birth out of wedlock (a moral position) co-existing with legal protection for children who are born out of wedlock.

Personal behaviours covered by the text are extensive. For example, verses 2.51–2.56 recommend that a monk must go on his begging round, collect alms food and present it to his teacher first, then eat. One should revere whatever food one gets and eat it without disdain, states Manusmriti, but never overeat, as eating too much harms health. In verse 5.47, the text states that work becomes without effort when a man contemplates, undertakes and does what he loves to do and when he does so without harming any creature.

Numerous verses relate to the practice of meat eating, how it causes injury to living beings, why it is evil, and the morality of vegetarianism. Yet, the text balances its moral tone as an appeal to one's conscience, states Olivelle. For example, verse 5.56 as translated by Olivelle states, "there is no fault in eating meat, in drinking liquor, or in having sex; that is the natural activity of creatures. Abstaining from such activity, however, brings greatest rewards."

=== On rights of women ===
The Manusmriti outlines numerous restrictions for women. In a famous verse, it preaches that a women should never be independent. Instead, as a girl, a woman should obey and seek protection of her father, as a young woman her husband, and as a widow her son. The text directs that "a good woman should always worship her husband like a god."

Manusmriti forbids widows to remarry and commands chastity. It says that a widow "should remain patient, controlled, and celibate until her death."

Women are accorded certain rights in Manusmriti, often at the discretion of men. Manusmriti provides a woman with property rights to six types of property in verses, but he gives few other details. These include those she received at her marriage, or as gift when she eloped or when she was taken away, or as token of love before marriage, or as gifts from her biological family, or as received from her husband subsequent to marriage, and also from inheritance from deceased relatives. The work also directs husbands to consider his wife an embodiment of goddess.

=== Internal inconsistencies ===
Manusmriti offers inconsistent and internally conflicting perspective at times. The text, for example, declares that a marriage cannot be dissolved by a woman or a man, in verse 8.101–8.102. Yet, the text, in other sections, allows either to dissolve the marriage. For example, verses 9.72–9.81 allow the man or the woman to get out of a fraudulent or abusive marriage and remarry. The text also provides legal means for a woman to remarry when her husband has been missing or has abandoned her.

Simultaneously, states Olivelle, the text enumerates numerous practices such as marriages outside one's varna (see anuloma and pratiloma), such as between a Brahmin man and a Shudra woman in verses 9.149–9.157, a widow becoming pregnant by a man she is not married to in verses 9.57–9.62, marriage where a woman elopes with her lover, and then grants legal rights in these cases such as property inheritance rights in verses 9.143–9.157, and the legal rights of the children so born. The text also provides for a situation when a married woman may become pregnant by a man other than her husband, and dedicates verses 8.31–8.56 to conclude that the child's custody belongs to the woman and her legal husband, and not to the biological father.

=== On statecraft and rules of war ===
Chapter 7 of the Manusmriti discusses the duties of a king, what virtues he must have, what vices he must avoid. In verses 7.54–7.76, the text identifies precepts to be followed in selecting ministers, ambassadors and officials, as well as the characteristics of well fortified capital. Manusmriti then lays out the laws of just war, stating that first and foremost, war should be avoided by negotiations and reconciliations. If war becomes necessary, states Manusmriti, a soldier must never harm civilians, non-combatants or someone who has surrendered, that use of force should be proportionate, and other rules. Fair taxation guidelines are described in verses 7.127–7.137.

=== On virtues and outcast ===
Manusmriti lists and recommends virtues in many verses. For example, verse 6.75 recommends non-violence towards everyone and temperance as key virtues, while verse 10.63 preaches that all four varnas must abstain from injuring any creature, abstain from falsehood and abstain from appropriating the property of others.

Similarly, in verse 4.204, states Olivelle, some manuscripts of Manusmriti list the recommended virtues to be, "compassion, forbearance, truthfulness, non-injury, self-control, not desiring, meditation, serenity, sweetness and honesty" as primary, and "purification, sacrifices, ascetic toil, gift giving, Vedic recitation, restraining the sexual organs, observances, fasts, silence and bathing" as secondary. A few manuscripts of the text contain a different verse 4.204, according to Olivelle, and list the recommended virtues to be, "not injuring anyone, speaking the truth, chastity, honesty and not stealing" as central and primary, while "not being angry, obedience to the teacher, purification, eating moderately and vigilance" to desirable and secondary.

In other discovered manuscripts of Manusmriti, including the most translated Calcutta manuscript, the text declares in verse 4.204 that the ethical precepts under Yamas such as Ahimsa (non-violence) are paramount while Niyamas such as Ishvarapranidhana (contemplation of personal god) are minor, and those who do not practice the Yamas but obey the Niyamas alone become outcasts.

== Authenticity and inconsistencies in various manuscripts ==
Patrick Olivelle, credited with a 2005 translation of Manusmriti published by the Oxford University Press, states the concerns in postmodern scholarship about the presumed authenticity and reliability of Manusmriti manuscripts. He writes (abridged),

The MDh [Manusmriti] was the first Indian legal text introduced to the western world through the translation of Sir William Jones in 1794. ... All the editions of the MDh, except for Jolly's, reproduce the text as found in the [Calcutta] manuscript containing the commentary of Kulluka. I have called this as the "vulgate version". It was Kulluka's version that has been translated repeatedly: Jones (1794), Burnell (1884), Buhler (1886) and Doniger (1991). ...

The belief in the authenticity of Kulluka's text was openly articulated by Burnell (1884, xxix): "There is then no doubt that the textus receptus, viz., that of Kulluka Bhatta, as adopted in India and by European scholars, is very near on the whole to the original text." This is far from the truth. Indeed, one of the great surprises of my editorial work has been to discover how few of the over fifty manuscripts that I collated actually follow the vulgate in key readings.

— Patrick Olivelle, Manu's Code of Law (2005)

Other scholars point to the inconsistencies and have questioned the authenticity of verses, and the extent to which verses were changed, inserted or interpolated into the original, at a later date. Sinha, for example, states that less than half, or only 1,214 of the 2,685 verses in Manusmriti, may be authentic. Further, the verses are internally inconsistent. Verses such as 3.55–3.62 of Manusmriti, for example, glorify the position of women, while verse such as 9.3 and 9.17 do the opposite. Other passages found in Manusmriti, such as those relating to Ganesha, are modern era insertions and forgeries. Robert E. Van Voorst states that the verses from 3.55–60 may be about respect given to a woman in her home, but within a strong patriarchal system.

Nelson in 1887, in a legal brief before the Madras High Court of British India, had stated, "there are various contradictions and inconsistencies in the Manu Smriti itself, and that these contradictions would lead one to conclude that such a commentary did not lay down legal principles to be followed but were merely recommendatory in nature." Mahatma Gandhi remarked on the observed inconsistencies within Manusmriti as follows:

I hold Manusmriti as part of Shastras. But that does not mean that I swear by every verse that is printed in the book described as Manusmriti. There are so many contradictions in the printed volume that, if you accept one part, you are bound to reject those parts that are wholly inconsistent with it. ... Nobody is in possession of the original text.

— Mahatma Gandhi, An Adi-Dravida's Difficulties

== Commentaries ==
There are numerous classical commentaries on the Manusmṛti written in the medieval period.

Bhāruci is the oldest known commentator on the Manu Smṛti. Kane places him in the late 10th or early 11th century, Olivelle places him in the 8th century, and Derrett places him between 600 and 800 CE. From these three opinions we can place Bhāruci anywhere from the early 7th century CE to the early 11th century CE. Bhāruci's commentary, titled Manu-sastra-vivarana, has far fewer number of verses than the Kullūka-Calcutta vulgate version in circulation since the British colonial era, and it refers to more ancient texts that are believed to be lost. It is also called Raja-Vimala, and J. Duncan M. Derrett states Bharuci was "occasionally more faithful to his source's historical intention" than other commentators.

Medhātithi's commentary on Manu Smṛti has been widely studied. Scholars such as Buhler, Kane, and Lingat believe he was from north India, likely the Kashmir region. His commentary on Manusmriti is estimated to be from 9th to 11th century.

Govindarāja's commentary, titled Manutika, is an 11th-century commentary on Manusmriti, referred to by Jimutavahana and Laksmidhara, and was plagiarised by Kullūka, states Olivelle.

Kullūka's commentary, titled Manvarthamuktavali, along with his version of the Manusmrti manuscript has been "vulgate" or default standard, most studied version, since it was discovered in 18th-century Calcutta by the British colonial officials. It is the most reproduced and famous, not because, according to Olivelle, it is the oldest or because of its excellence, but because it was the lucky version found first. The Kullūka commentary dated to be sometime between the 13th to 15th century, adds Olivelle, is mostly a plagiary of Govindaraja commentary from about the 11th century, but with Kullūka's criticism of Govindaraja.

Nārāyana's commentary, titled Manvarthavivrtti, is probably from the 14th century and little is known about the author. This commentary includes many variant readings, and Olivelle found it useful in preparing a critical edition of the Manusmriti text in 2005.

Nandana was from south India, and his commentary, titled Nandini, provides a useful benchmark on Manusmriti version and its interpretation in the south.

Other known medieval era commentaries on Manusmriti include those by Sarvajnanarayana, Raghavananda and Ramacandra.

== Significance and role in history ==
=== In ancient and medieval India ===
Scholars doubt Manusmriti was ever administered as a law-text in ancient or medieval Hindu society. David Buxbaum states, "in the opinion of the best contemporary orientalists, it [Manusmriti] does not, as a whole, represent a set of rules ever actually administered in India . It is in great part an ideal picture of that which, in the view of a Brahmin, ought to be law".

Donald Davis writes, "there is no historical evidence for either an active propagation or implementation of Dharmasastra [Manusmriti] by a ruler or any state – as distinct from other forms of recognizing, respecting and using the text. Thinking of Dharmasastra as a legal code and of its authors as lawgivers is thus a serious misunderstanding of its history". Other scholars have expressed the same view, based on epigraphical, archaeological and textual evidence from medieval Hindu kingdoms in Gujarat, Kerala and Tamil Nadu, while acknowledging that Manusmriti was influential to the South Asian history of law and was a theoretical resource. Scholars like Patrick Olivelle note that while the Manusmriti was influential in shaping ancient Indian law, its practical application varied across regions and eras, and its authority was not universal.

=== Outside India ===
The Dharma-sastras, particularly Manusmriti, states Anthony Reid, were "greatly honored in Burma's (Myanmar) Wareru Dhammathat, Siam (Thailand), Cambodia and Java-Bali (Indonesia) as the defining documents of the natural order, which kings were obliged to uphold. They were copied, translated and incorporated into local law code, with strict adherence to the original text in Burma and Siam, and a stronger tendency to adapt to local needs in Java (Indonesia)". The medieval-era derived texts and Manusmriti manuscripts in Southeast Asia are, however, quite different than the "vulgate" version that has been in use since its first use in British India. The role of then extant Manusmriti as a historic foundation of law texts for the people of Southeast Asia has been very important, states Hooker.

=== In British India ===
Prior to the British colonial rule, Sharia (Islamic law) for Muslims in South Asia had been codified as Fatawa-e-Alamgiri, but laws for non-Muslims – such as Hindus, Buddhists, Sikhs, Jains, Parsis – were not codified - both in regions of the subcontinent that witnessed anything up to 600 years of Islamic rule - as well as others. With the arrival of the British colonial officials, Manusmriti played a historic role in constructing a legal system for non-Muslims in South Asia and early Western perceptions about the ancient and medieval Indian society.

In the 18th century, the earliest British of the East India Company acted as agents of the Mughal emperor. As the British colonial rule took over the political and administrative powers in India, it was faced with various state responsibilities such as legislative and judiciary functions. The East India Company, and later the British Crown, sought profits for its British shareholders through trade as well as sought to maintain effective political control with minimal military engagement. The administration pursued a path of least resistance, relying upon co-opted local intermediaries that were mostly Muslims and some Hindus in various princely states. The British exercised power by avoiding interference and adapting to law practices as explained by the local intermediaries. The existing legal texts for Muslims, and resurrected Manusmriti manuscript thus helped the colonial state sustain the pre-colonial religious and political law and conflicts, well into the late nineteenth century. The colonial policy on the system of personal laws for India, for example, was expressed by Governor-General Hastings in 1772 as follows,

That in all suits regarding inheritance, marriage, caste and other religious usages or institutions, the law of the Koran with respect to Mahometans [Muslims], and those of the Shaster with respect to Gentoos [Hindus] shall be invariably be adhered to.

— Warren Hastings, August 15, 1772

For Muslims of India, the British accepted sharia as the legal code for Muslims, based on texts such the al-Sirjjiyah and Fatawa-i Alamgiri written under sponsorship of Aurangzeb. For Hindus and other non-Muslims such as Buddhists, Sikhs, Jains, and Parsis, this information was unavailable. The substance of Hindu law was derived by the British colonial officials from Manusmriti, and it became the first Dharmasastra that was translated in 1794. The British colonial officials, for practice, attempted to extract from the Dharmaśāstra, the English categories of law and religion for the purposes of colonial administration.

The British colonial officials, however, mistook the Manusmriti as codes of law, failing to recognise that it was a commentary on morals and law and not a statement of positive law. The colonial officials of the early 19th century also failed to recognise that Manusmriti was one of many competing Dharmasastra texts, it was not in use for centuries during the Islamic rule period of India. The officials resurrected Manusmriti, constructed statements of positive law from the text for non-Muslims, in order to remain faithful to its policy of using sharia for the South Asian Muslim population. Manusmriti thus played a role in constructing the Anglo-Hindu law, as well as Western perceptions about ancient and medieval era Hindu culture from the colonial times. Abdullahi Ahmed An-Na'im states the significance and role of Manusmriti in governing India during the colonial era as follows (abridged),

The [British] colonial administration began the codification of Hindu and Muslim laws in 1772 and continued through the next century, with emphasis on certain texts as the authentic "sources" of the law and custom of Hindus and Muslims, which in fact devalued and retarded those dynamic social systems. The codification of complex and interdependent traditional systems froze certain aspects of the status of women, for instance, outside the context of constantly evolving social and economic relations, which in effect limited or restricted women's rights. The selectivity of the process, whereby colonial authorities sought the assistance of Hindu and Muslim religious elites in understanding the law, resulted in the Brahminization and Islamization of customary laws [in British India]. For example, the British orientalist scholar William Jones translated the key texts Al Sirjjiyah in 1792 as the Mohammedan Law of Inheritance, and Manusmriti in 1794 as the Institutes of Hindu Law or the Ordinances of Manu. In short, British colonial administrators reduced centuries of vigorous development of total ethical, religious and social systems to fit their own preconceived European notions of what Muslim and Hindu "law" should be.

— Abdullahi Ahmed An-Na'im, Islam and the Secular State: Negotiating the Future of Sharia

Another scholar, Supriya Gandhi, writing in the Journal of Hindu Studies, states

...whatever its historical status, however, most scholars today agree that it (Manu Smriti) took on unprecedented status as an "applied" legal document only under early British rule' (Dirks, 2001: 34). when Sir William Jones, who was a judge of the Supreme Court of Bengal appointed by the Crown, threw his weight behind Manu Smriti as the Institutes of Hindu Law (Rocher, 2010), Manu smriti acquired a status disproportionate to its actual stature in India in terms of people's awareness and acceptance of it in contrast to customs.

— Supriya Gandhi, Dharmaśāstra in Aurangzeb’s India: A Persian Translation of the Yājñavalkya Smṛti and Mitākṣarā,

== Comparison with other dharmasastras ==
Along with Manusmriti (Manava Dharmasastra), ancient India had between eighteen and thirty six competing Dharma-sastras, states John Bowker. Many of these texts have been lost completely or in parts, but they are referred to in other ancient Indian texts suggesting that they were influential in some regions or time. Of the numerous jurisprudence-related commentaries and Smriti texts, after Manu Smriti and other than the older Dharma Sutras, Yajnavalkya Smriti has attracted the attention of many scholars, followed by Narada Smriti and Parashara Smriti (the oldest Dharma-smriti). According to Ghose and other scholars, evidence suggests that Yajnavalkya Smriti was the more referred to text than Manu Smriti in matters of governance and practice. This text, of unclear date of composition but likely to be a few centuries after Manusmriti, is more "concise, methodical, distilled and liberal". According to Jois,

Regarding the 18 titles of law, Yajnavalkya follows the same pattern as in Manu with slight modifications. On matters such as women's rights of inheritance and right to hold property, status of Sudras, and criminal penalty, Yajnavalkya is more liberal than Manu. ... He deals exhaustively on subjects like creation of valid documents, law of mortgages, hypothecation, partnership and joint ventures.

— M. Rama Jois, Legal and Constitutional History of India

Jois suggests that the Yajnavalkya Smriti text's liberal evolution may have been influenced by Buddhism in ancient India. The Yajnavalkya text is also different from Manu text in adding chapters to the organisation of monasteries, land grants, deeds execution and other matters. The Yajnavalkya text was more referred to by many Hindu kingdoms of the medieval era, as evidenced by the commentary of 12th-century Vijñāneśvara, titled Mitakshara.

== Controversies ==
The Manusmriti has been a subject of significant debate due to its prescriptions regarding social hierarchy, particularly its views on women, transgenders and Shudras (often associated with lower castes or untouchables in later interpretations). These views have sparked criticism for promoting inequality, while some scholars argue they reflect the socio-cultural context of ancient India.

=== Views on women ===
The Manusmriti outlines specific roles and restrictions for women, emphasizing their dependence on male relatives. In Chapter 5, Verse 148, it states, "In childhood, a female must be protected by her father, in youth by her husband, and when her lord is dead then by her sons; a woman should never be independent. This verse, among others, has been criticised for endorsing patriarchal control and limiting women's autonomy. Chapter 9, Verse 3 further prescribes that women should be guarded to ensure their chastity, which some modern scholars interpret as restricting women's agency. However, defenders of the text, such as traditionalist scholars, argue that these injunctions aimed to protect women within the social framework of the time, though such interpretations are contested.

Feminist scholars, such as Kumkum Roy, have highlighted that the Manusmriti’s emphasis on women’s subordination contrasts with other ancient Indian texts, like the Rigveda, which depict women in more varied roles. Critics argue that these prescriptions contributed to rigid gender norms in later Indian society, influencing practices such as early marriage. It restricted property inheritance rights for women (Chapter 9, Verses 118–120).

=== Views on Shudras ===
The Manusmriti assigns Shudras the role of serving the three higher varnas (Brahmins, Kshatriyas, and Vaishyas) and imposes significant restrictions on their social and religious participation. Chapter 8, Verse 410 states, "A Shudra, though emancipated by his master, is not released from servitude; since that is innate in him, who can set him free from it?" Additionally, Chapter 10, Verse 129 prohibits Shudras from studying the Vedas or performing certain rituals, reinforcing their subordinate status. These verses have been widely criticised for institutionalizing caste hierarchy and justifying the marginalisation of Shudras, often equated with untouchables in later caste practices.

Modern activists, such as B.R. Ambedkar, have condemned these prescriptions as foundational to caste oppression, with Ambedkar famously burning copies of the Manusmriti in 1927 to protest its influence on caste discrimination. Conversely, some traditionalist scholars argue that the text’s rules were context-specific and not intended to dehumanise Shudras, but rather to organise society functionally. Critics counter that such interpretations fail to address the systemic exclusion embedded in the text.

=== Modern reception and criticism ===
The Manusmriti’s endorsement of inequality, especially for women and Shudras, have fueled debates about its relevance in contemporary India. Reformers like Ambedkar and feminist movements have cited the text as a source of social inequality, advocating for its rejection or reinterpretation. Ambedkar participated in a conference where Manusmriti was burned in 1927.

Some modern controversies about the "Manusmriti" have concerned statues honouring Manu as a lawmaker. For example, a statue of Manu was unveiled before the Rajasthan high court in 1989 and has faced repeated calls for its removal. Those calling for the removal say that the Manu statue is a "symbol of injustice" and honoured a "mindset of inequality and discrimination" with roots in the Manusmriti.

In contrast, some conservative Hindu groups view the Manusmriti as a sacred legal text, though they often emphasise its ethical teachings over its controversial social prescriptions.

== Editions and translations ==
- Sacred Books of the East: The Laws of Manus. Vol. XXV. Translated by Bühler, G. Oxford: Clarendon Press. 1886.
- Ganganath Jha, Manusmriti with the Commentary of Medhatithi, 1920, ISBN 8120811550
- J. I. Shastri (ed.), Manusmriti with Kullukabhatta Commentary (1972–1974), reprinted by Motilal Banarsidass, ISBN 978-8120807662.
- Olivelle, Patrick (2004). The Law Code of Manu. New York: Oxford University Press. ISBN 0192802712.
- Olivelle, Patrick (2005). Manu's Code of Law: A Critical Edition and Translation of the Mānava-Dharmaśāstra. Oxford: Oxford University Press. ISBN 0195171462.
- Pranjivan Harihar Pandya (ed.), Manusmriti; With a commentary called Manvarth Muktavali by Kullooka Bhatt, Bombay, 1913.
- Ramacandra Varma Shastri, Manusmr̥ti: Bhāratīya ācāra-saṃhitā kā viśvakośa, Śāśvata Sāhitya Prakāśana, 1997.
- The Institutes of Hindu Law: Or, The Ordinances of Manu, Calcutta: Sewell & Debrett, 1796.

== See also ==
- Apastamba Dharmasutra
- Arthashastra
- Classical Hindu law
- Classical Hindu law in practice
- Dharmaśāstra
- Gentoo Code
- Hindu law
- Kalpa (Vedanga)
- Kalpa Sūtra
- Vajrasuchi Upanishad
- Yājñavalkya Smṛti
