= Kalpa (Vedanga) =

Study of Vedic ritual practices

Kalpa (Sanskrit: कल्प) means "proper, fit" and is one of the six disciplines of the Vedānga, or ancillary science connected with the Vedas – the scriptures of Hinduism. This field of study is focused on the procedures and ceremonies associated with Vedic ritual practice.

The major texts of Kalpa Vedanga are called Kalpa Sutras in Hinduism. The scope of these texts includes Vedic rituals, rites of passage rituals associated with major life events such as birth, wedding and death in family, as well as personal conduct and proper duties in the life of an individual. Most Kalpasutras texts have experienced interpolation, changes and consequent corruption over their history, and Apasthamba Kalpasutra ancillary to the Yajurveda may be the best preserved text in this genre.

Kalpa Sutras are also found in other Indian traditions, such as Jainism.

== Etymology ==
Kalpa is a Sanskrit word that means "proper, fit, competent, sacred precept", and also refers to one of the six Vedanga fields of study. In Vedanga context, the German Indologist Max Muller translated it as "the Ceremonial".

The word is widely used in other contexts, such as "cosmic time" (one day for Brahma, 4.32 billion human years), as well as "formal procedures" in medicine or other secular contexts.

== History ==
The Kalpa field of study traces its roots to the Brahmana layer of texts in the Vedas, however its texts are more focussed, clear, short and practical for ceremonies. Kalpa Sutras are related to the Karma kanda, or ritual parts of the Veda, in contrast to the Upanishads which are the Jnana kanda, or the knowledge part.

This field of study emerged to serve the needs of priests as they officiated over domestic ceremonies such as weddings and baby naming rites of passage, so that the rituals were efficient, standardized and appeared consistent across different events. They also helped the audience and the individuals integrate within customs and cultural practices, state Winternitz and Sarma, from "the moment when he is received in his mother's womb to the hour of his death", and beyond during his cremation.

== Texts ==
Kalpa sutras known
Veda	Sutras
Rigveda	Asvalayana-sutra (§), Sankhayana-sutra (§), Saunaka-sutra (¶)
Samaveda	Latyayana-sutra (§), Drahyayana-sutra (§), Nidana-sutra (§), Pushpa-sutra (§), Anustotra-sutra (§)
Yajurveda	Manava-sutra (§), Bharadvaja-sutra (¶), Vadhuna-sutra (¶), Vaikhanasa-sutra (¶), Laugakshi-sutra (¶), Maitra-sutra (¶), Katha-sutra (¶), Varaha-sutra (¶), Apastamba-sutra (§), Baudhayana-sutra (§)
Atharvaveda	Kusika-sutra (§)
¶: only quotes survive; §: text survives

The rituals related to ancient texts are of two kinds: (1) the Śrautasūtras, which are based on the śruti, and (2) the Smārtasūtras, or rules based on the smriti or tradition. The first versions of the Kalpa Sutras text were probably composed in the 6th century BCE, and they were attributed to famous Vedic sages out of respect for them in the Hindu traditions or to gain authority. These texts are written aphoristic sutras style, and therefore are taxonomies or terse guidebooks rather than detailed manuals or handbooks for any ceremony.

Scholars such as Monier-Williams classified only Shrautasutras as part of Kalpa Vedanga, stating that the Smartasutras did not relate to Srauta or Vedic ceremonies, but instead focused on domestic events such as rites of passage when a baby is born and to Samayachara or "conventional everyday practices" that are part of every human being's life. However, other scholars include both.

=== Srauta Sutras ===
The verses 1-2 of Baudhayana Shulba Sutra state that the squares of any rectangle's width and length add up to the square of its diagonal. This is one of the earliest descriptions of Pythagorean theorem, appearing many centuries before Pythagoras.

The Śrautasūtras (Shrauta-sutra) form a part of the corpus of Sanskrit sūtra literature. Their topics include instructions relating to the use of the śruti corpus in ritual ('kalpa') and the correct performance of these rituals. Some early Śrautasūtras were composed in the late Brahmana period (such as the Baudhyanana and Vadhula Sūtras), but the bulk of the Śrautasūtras are roughly contemporary to the Gṛhya corpus of domestic sūtras, their language being late Vedic Sanskrit, dating to the middle of the first millennium BCE (generally predating Pāṇini). Not verified though

=== Shulba Sutras ===
The Śulbasûtra (or Shulva-sutras) deal with the mathematical methodology to construct altar geometries for the Vedic rituals. The Sanskrit word "Shulba" means cord, and these texts are "rules of the cord". They provide, states Kim Plofker, what in modern mathematical terminology would be called "area preserving transformations of plane figures", tersely describing geometric formulae and constants. Five Shulba Sutras texts have survived through history, of which the oldest surviving is likely the Baudhayana Shulba Sutra (800–500 BCE), while the one by Katyayana may be chronologically the youngest (~300 BCE).

=== Gṛhyasūtras ===
The Gṛhyasūtras "domestic sūtras" are a category of Sanskrit texts prescribing Vedic rituals, mainly relating to rites of passage such as rituals of wedding, birth celebration, namegiving and coming of age (puberty). Their language is late Vedic Sanskrit, and they date to around roughly 500 BCE, contemporary with the Śrautasūtras. They are named after Vedic shakhas.

Vedic sacrifice rituals at a wedding
West of the (sacred) fire, a stone (for grinding corn and condiments) is placed and northeast a water jar. The bridegroom offers an oblation, standing, looking towards the west, and taking hold of the bride's hands while she sits and looks towards the east. If he wishes only for sons, he clasps her thumbs and says, "I clasp thy hands for the sake of good fortune"; the fingers alone, if he wishes only for daughters; the hairy side of the hand along with the thumbs if wishes for both (sons and daughters). Then, whilst he leads her towards the right three times around the fire, and round the water jar, he says in a low tone,
"I am he, thou are she; thou art she, I am he,
I am the heaven, thou art the earth; I am the Saman, thou art the Rig.
Come let us marry, let us possess offspring,
united in affection, well disposed to each other,
let us live for a hundred years".
— Āśvalāyana Kalpa sutra, Book 1.7, Translated by Monier Monier-Williams

=== Dharmasūtras ===
The Dharmasūtras are texts dealing with custom, rituals, duties and law. They include the four surviving written works of the ancient Indian tradition on the subject of dharma, or the rules of behavior recognized by a community. Unlike the later dharmaśāstras, the dharmasūtras are composed in prose. The oldest dharmasūtra is generally believed to have been that of Apastamba, followed by the dharmasūtras of Gautama, Baudhayana, and an early version of Vashistha. It is difficult to determine exact dates for these texts, but the dates between 500 and 300 BCE have been suggested for the oldest dharmasūtras.

Veda	Srautasutra	Sulbasutra	Grihyasutra	Dharmasutra
Ṛgveda	Āśvalāyana Śrautasūtra; Sāṅkhāyana Śrautasūtra		Âśvalāyana-Gṛhyasūtra; Kausîtaki-Gṛhyasūtra (Bāṣkala śakha); Śāṅkhāyana-Gr̥hyasūtra	Vasishtha Dharmasūtra
Sāmaveda	Lātyāyana Śrautasūtra; Drāhyāyana Śrautasūtra; Jaiminiya Śrautasūtra		Gobhila-Gṛhyasūtra; Khādira-Gṛhyasūtra (Drāhyāyana-Gṛhyasūtra); Jaiminiya-Gṛhyasūtra; Kauthuma-Gṛhyasūtra	Gautama Dharmasūtra
Kṛsna Yajurveda	Baudhāyana Śrautasūtra; Vādhūla Śrautasūtra; Mānava Śrautasūtra; Bharadvāja Śrautasūtra; Āpastamba Śrautasūtra; Hiraṅyakeśi Śrautasūtra; Vārāha Śrautasūtra; Vaikhānasa Śrautasūtra	Baudhāyana Śulbasûtra; Mānava Śulbasûtra; Āpastamba Śulbasûtra	Baudhāyana-Gṛhyasūtra; Hiraṇyakeśi-Gṛhyasūtra (Satyāsādha-Gṛhyasūtra); Mānava-Gṛhyasūtra; Bhāradvāja-Gṛhyasūtra; Āpastamba-Gṛhyasūtra; Āgniveśya-Gṛhyasūtra; Vaikhānasa-Gṛhyasūtra; Kāthaka-Gṛhyasūtra (Laugāksi-Gṛhyasūtra); Vārāha-Gṛhyasūtra; Vādhûla-Gṛhyasūtra; Kapisthala-Katha Gṛhyasūtra (unpublished)	Baudhāyana Dharmasūtra Āpastamba Dharmasūtra Hārīta Dharmasūtra Hiraṇyakeśi Dharmasūtra Vaikhānasa Dharmasūtra Viṣṇu Dharmasūtra
Śukla Yajurveda	Kātyāyana Śrautasūtra	Kātyāyana Śulbasūtra	Pāraskara-Gṛhyasūtra; Katyayana-Gṛhyasūtra	Śaṅkha-Likhita Dharmasūtra
Atharvaveda	Vaitāna Śrautasũtra		Kauśika Gṛhyasūtra	Auśanasa Dharmasūtra

== See also ==
- Kalpa Sūtra, scriptures of Jainism
- Mīmāṃsā
- Orthopraxy
