= Baudhayana =

Indian sage and mathematician

- बौधायन
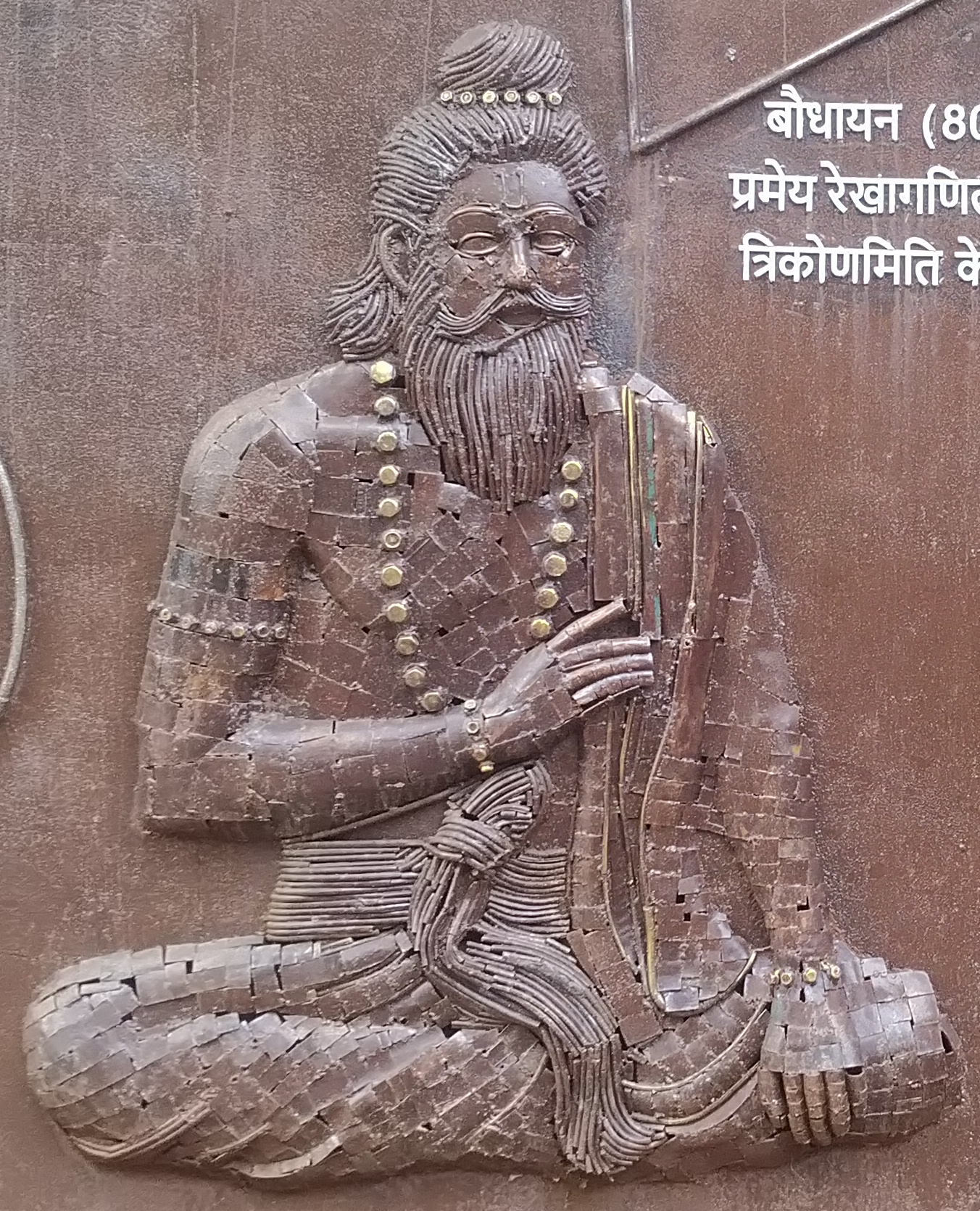
- Bas-relief in Shaheedi Park
- Born: Upvarsha; Swami Bodhayan Mandir, Bangaon Village, Bajpatti block, Sitamarhi district, Mithila region, Bihar
- Monuments: Swami Bodhayan Mandir
- Other name: Bodhayan
- Education: Tradition: Taittirīya Śākhā (Kṛṣṇa Yajurveda)
- Occupations: Vedic sage, Sūtrakāra, Kalpavid
- Era: 8th Century BCE
- Known for: Baudhayana Sutra
- Notable work: Baudhāyana Kalpasūtra (Śrautasūtra, Gṛhyasūtra, Dharmasūtra, Śulbasūtra)
- Parents: Shankardutt (father); Charumati (mother)

Baudhayana (Sanskrit: बौधायन, Romanised: Baudhāyana), believed to have lived around the 8th century BCE , was a Vedic scholar and sūtrakāra affiliated with the Taittirīya Śākhā of the Kṛṣṇa Yajurveda. He is known for having written the Baudhāyana Kalpasūtra, a foundational manual of the Kalpa Vedānga, which contains the Baudhāyana Śulbasūtra, the oldest known work on geometry and ritual mathematics. His birth anniversary is known as Baudhāyana Jayanti or Bodhayan Jayanti or Bodhayan Janmotsav in the Mithila region.

== Birth ==
In local traditions of the Mithila region, Baudhāyana is also called as Bhagwan Bodhayana. According to these accounts, he was born on the Dwadashi (twelfth day) in Krishna Paksha (waning phase) in the Hindu calendar month of Pausha. He is believed to have been born in Bangaon village, located in the Bajpatti block of Sitamarhi district, Bihar. His childhood name was Upvarsha. His was the son of Shankardutt, a scholar of Pataliputra and Charumati.

== Description and works ==
Baudhāyana is traditionally regarded as one of the earliest sūtrakāras (systematizers) affiliated with the Taittirīya Śākhā (school) of the Kṛṣṇa Yajurveda. His corpus forms the Baudhāyana Kalpasūtra, a comprehensive manual belonging to the Kalpa Vedāṅga—one of the six auxiliary disciplines essential for proper study and the practice of Vedic texts.

The Baudhāyana Kalpasūtra is a multi-part canonical work comprising:

- Śrautasūtra: Procedures for public Vedic sacrifices (yajñas)
- Gṛhyasūtra: Domestic rites and household sacraments (saṃskāras)
- Dharmasūtra: Ethical, legal, and social codes
- Śulbasūtra: Geometric principles, spatial layouts, and construction rules for fire altars (vedis and citis)
- Pariśiṣṭas & Karmāntasūtras: Supplementary procedural manuals

In the Vedic classification of knowledge (vidyā), applied science such as Śulba-śāstra (geometry) and Jyotiṣa (astronomy and calendar calculation) were practiced as Aparā-vidyā. These are essential empirical disciplines developed to sustain the cosmic and ritual harmony required by the Vedic tradition.

Dating from approximately the eighth century BCE, Baudhāyana was one of the earliest theorists who formulated the geometric principles such that it directly addressed, spatial and numerical calculations in ancient India.

Later folklore and regional traditions sometimes identify Baudhāyana with the commentator Upavarṣa. The Baudhāyana Śākhā (school) preserved traditions of ritual practice, and theology within the Taittirīya tradition. This included early references to veneration of Vishnu as Mahāpuruṣa alongside other vedic deities.

The dates of the major Śulbasūtras( Baudhāyana, Mānava and Āpastambha) are estimated between the 8th and 5th centuries BCE, with Baudhyāna Sūtras generally placed earliest, around 800 BCE.

== Mathematics ==
The Baudhāyana Śulbasūtra (derived from the Sanskrit root śulb, meaning 'to measure' or 'cord') constitutes the earliest written manual of Indian geometry. The Śulba tradition was closely associated with the practical requirements of Vedic ritual, particularly the measurement and construction of fire altars, and expressed geometrical knowledge through procedures of measurement and construction.

Vedic altars were required to adhere to precise geometric shapes; specific altar types (such as the falcon-shaped Śyenaciti, circular Gārhapatya, square Āhavanīya, and semicircular Dakṣiṇāgni) were mandated to have identical surface areas or scaled proportions. These requirements necessitated exact geometric solutions for:

- Area-preserving transformations: Constructing a square equal in area to a circle and vice versa.
- The diagonal Rule (Bhujā-koṭi-karṇa-nyāya): Formulating the relation between the base (Bhujā), altitude (koṭi), and diagonal (karṇa) of rectangles and squares.
- Surd approximations: Calculating accurate square roots (such as $\sqrt{2}$ up to five decimal places) using recursive fractional steps for cord alignment.

In the sūtra tradition, geometric validations were demonstrated through practical construction (upapatti or visual demonstration) or oral transmission as opposed to written proofs.

=== The Diagonal Rule (Bhujā-koṭi-karṇa-nyāya) ===
In the Baudhāyana Śulbasūtra, the geometric relationship governing right-angled triangles and rectangles is expressed as the cord rule (nyāya) relating the horizontal base (Bhujā), vertical altitude (koṭi), and diagonal (karṇa).

Prior to the general theorem for rectangles, BS 1.9 establishes the special case for the square:

समचतुरश्रस्याक्ष्णया रज्जुर्द्विस्तावतीं भूमिं करोति ॥
samacaturaśrasyākṣṇayā rajjudvistāvatīṃ bhūmiṃ karoti
— (Baudhāyana Śulbasūtra 1.9)

Meaning, "The diagonal of a square produces double the area (of that square)."

In BS 1.12, Baudhāyana states the general theorem for any rectangle:

दीर्घचतुरश्रस्याक्ष्णया रज्जुः पार्श्वमानी तिर्यङ् मानी च यत् पृथग् भूते कुरुतस्तदुभयं करोति ॥
dīrghacaturaśrasyākṣṇayā rajjuḥ pārśvamānī tiryaṅmānī ca yat pṛthagbhūte kurutastadubhayaṃ karoti
— (Baudhāyana Śulbasūtra 1.12)

Meaning, "The areas (of the squares) produced separately by the length and the breadth of a rectangle together equal the area (of the square) produced by the diagonal."

This is followed in BS 1.13 by a catalogue of integer rectangle sides that satisfy this rule (defining what are known in modern mathematics as Pythagorean triples): (3,4,5), (5,12,13), (8,15,17), (7,24,25), and (12, 35, 37)

According to mathematician S. G. Dani, the Babylonian cuneiform tablet Plimpton 322 written c. 1850 BCE "contains fifteen Pythagorean triples with quite large entries, including (13500, 12709, 18541) which is a primitive triple, indicating, in particular, that there was sophisticated understanding on the topic" in Mesopotamia in 1850 BCE. "Since these tablets predate the Sulbasutras period by several centuries, taking into account the contextual appearance of some of the triples, it is reasonable to expect that similar understanding would have been there in India."

=== Cord geometry and the doubling of the square (Dvikaraṇī) ===
To construct a sacrificial altar with twice the surface area of a given square altar, Baudhāyana formulated the rule of Dvikaraṇī (the multiplier of the diagonal, or $\sqrt{2}$). In BS 1.61–62, this value is given as a sequence of fractional additions.

$\sqrt{2} \approx 1 + \frac{1}{3} + \frac{1}{3 \times 4} - \frac{1}{3 \times 4 \times 34} = \frac{577}{408} \approx 1.4142156$

The expression is accurate up to five decimal places. ⁣ This expression is similar in structure to the expression found on a Mesopotamian tablet from the Old Babylonian period (1900–1600 BCE):

The text contains geometric solutions of linear and Quadratic equations, although these are expressed through geometric constructions rather than in explicit algebraic forms such as $ax^2 = c$ and $ax^2 + bx = c$. These techniques allowed ritual architects to transform rectangular altars into squares and circular hearths into squares without altering the total surface area.

=== Pi approximation ===
Shulba Sutras gave approximations of pi value which can be interpreted as approximately 3.08831, 3.08833, 3.004, 3, or 3.125.

== Commemoration ==
Since 1957, an annual commemoration known as Baudhāyana Jayanti (or "Bodhayan Janmotsav") has been observed at the Swami Bodhayan Mandir in the Sitamarhi district of Bihar. The annual observance includes community processions ("Kalash Yatra"), recitation, and temple rituals. In 2022, proposals were put forward to the Department of Art and Culture of Bihar to recognize the annual commemoration as an official regional festival.

== See also ==
- Pythagoras theorem
- Plimpton 322

== Bibliography ==
- Dani, S. G. (July 25, 2003), "On the Pythagorean triples in the Śulvasūtras" (PDF), Current Science, 85 (2): 219–224, archived (PDF) from the original on 2003-08-04
