= Apastamba Dharmasutra =

Ancient Dharma texts of Hinduism

Āpastamba Dharmasūtra (Sanskrit: आपस्तम्ब धर्मसूत्र) is a Sanskrit text and one of the oldest Dharma - post-vedic smriti-related texts of Hinduism that have survived into the modern age from the 1st millennium BCE. It is one of three extant Dharmasutras texts from the Taittiriya school which is relatively newer in comparison to Maitrayaniya shakha of Krishna Yajurveda, the other two being Baudhayana Dharmasutra and Hiranyakesin Dharmasutra.

The Apastamba Dharmasutra is part of Apastamba Kalpasutra collection, along with Apastamba Shrautasutra and Apastamba Grihyasutra. One of the best preserved ancient texts on Dharma, it is also notable for mentioning and citing views of ten ancient experts on Dharma, which has led scholars to conclude that there existed a rich genre of Dharmasutras text in ancient India before this text was composed.

== Authorship, location and dates ==
Duties of a teacher

Next the teacher's conduct towards his pupil.
Loving him like a son and totally devoted to him,
the teacher should impart knowledge to him,
without holding anything back,
with respect to any of the Laws.
Except in emergency, moreover,
he should not employ a pupil,
for purposes to the detriment of the pupil's studies.

— Apastamba Dharmasutras 1.8.23-25
Translator: Patrick Olivelle

The Dharmasutra is attributed to Apastamba, the founder of a Shakha (Vedic school) of Yajurveda. According to the Hindu tradition, Apastamba was the student of Baudhayana, and himself had a student named Hiranyakesin. Each of the three founded a Vedic school, and each of their schools produced a collection of literature within the Krishna Yajurveda tradition, one that included separate Kalpasutra compilations. They were founders of their traditions, but it is unclear if they authored the Dharmasutras. It is, states Patrick Olivelle, possible that the Apastamba Dharmasutra is ascribed to Apastamba, but actually composed by others in his school.

The Apastamba tradition may be from south India, possibly near where modern Andhra Pradesh and Telangana is between Godavari and Krishna rivers, but this is not certain. The verse 2.17.17 of the Apastamba Dharmasutra mentions a practice of "northerners" but it in unclear what "north" means in the context it is used. (May be in Sanskrit it is Uttaradi. In Madhwa parampara, there are three Mutts-- Uttaradi, Vyasaraya and Mantralaya. In this context, majority of Apastamba tradition can be find in Madhwas) Further, the ancient grammarian Panini refers to it too, and he is generally placed in northwest Indian subcontinent. Olivelle states that the three Taittiriya school Dharmasutras mention practices of north and south, but never clarify how far north or south they are referring to, but placing Dharmasutras in the southern Indian peninsula implies that Brahmanical ideas had established themselves or emerged in the south by the 1st millennium BCE. According to Olivelle, the Yajurveda schools may have been in what is north India today, and the Apastamba Dharmasutra may have been composed in north India, rather than south. In contrast, Robert Lingat states that epigraphical evidence such as the Pallava inscriptions confirm that Apastamba tradition existed in South India, in ancient times, in parts of what became Madras Presidency in the colonial British India.

Kane estimated that Apastamba Dharmasutra dates from approximately 600-300 BCE, and later more narrowly to between 450 and 350 BCE. Lingat states that the internal evidence within the text hints of great antiquity, because unlike later Dharma texts, it makes no mention of Buddhism. Other scholars, such as Hopkins, assert that all this can be explained to be an artifact of its relatively remote geographical origins in Andhra region. Olivelle, and several other scholars, in contrast, state that the first version of Apastamba Dharmasutra may have been composed after others, but the extant version of the Apastamba text is the oldest Dharma text from ancient India.

Regardless of the relative chronology, the ancient Apastamba Dharmasutra, states Olivelle, shows clear signs of a maturing legal procedure tradition and that there were Dharma texts in ancient India before it was composed.

== Organization and content ==
The text is in sutra format, and part of thirty prashnas (प्रश्न, portions, issue, questions) of Apastamba Kalpasutra. The Apastamba Dharmasutra is the 28th and 29th prashna of this compilation, while the first 24 prashnas are about Shrautasutras (vedic rituals), 25th is an ancillary mantra section, 26th and 27th are Grihyasutras (householder rites of passage), and the last or the 30th prashna is a Shulbasutra (mathematics for altar building). The text is systematically arranged, cross references to other sections of the Kalpasutra compilation so extensively and accurately, as if it is the work of a single author.

Of the two books of this Dharmasūtra, the first is devoted to the student tradition and the second book is devoted to the householder tradition.

Apastamba Dharmasutras
Chapter
Topics (incomplete)
Translation
Comments

Book 1. Student life (Book 28 of Apastamba Kalpasutra)
1.1.1-3	Origins and reliable sources of law
1.1.4-1.7.30	Student at school, dress and cleanliness, residency, code of conduct, food, social classes, general rules, conduct towards teacher and teacher's family, end of school
1.7.31-1.19.15	Responsibility of the teacher, Veda studies, duty to teach, purification, rules on food
1.20.1-1.32-29	Law, trade, outcaste as a form of punishment for evil acts, penances, self-knowledge, graduation ceremonies

Book 2. Householder life (Book 29 of Apastamba Kalpasutra)
2.1.1-2.14.20	Wedding, rites, sex, food, respect for guests, post-school studies, charity, lawful occupations, remarriage, child custody, responsibilities to daughters and sons, inheritance
2.15.1-2.20.23	Family customs, regional customs, death in family, duties to ancestors, monthly offerings
2.21.1-2.24.14	Stages of life: student, wandering monk, hermit, relative superiority
2.25.1-2.26.17	King, duties of a king, government, taxes, tax collection, judiciary
2.26.18-2.29.15	Sexual misconduct, punishment for rape, adultery, levirate rules, crime and punishment, property rights, court system, rules of witnesses, final steps in the study of law

== Significance ==
Who doesn't pay taxes?

The following are exempt from taxes:
vedic scholars, women of all classes,
pre-pubescent boys,
all students studying with a guru,
ascetics, sudras who work as personal servants,
people who are blind, dumb, deaf and sick,
anyone excluded from acquiring property.

— Apastamba Dharmasutras 2.26.10-17

The Āpastamba Dharmasutra is notable for placing the importance of the Veda scriptures second and that of samayacarika or mutually agreed and accepted customs of practice first. Āpastamba proposes that scriptures alone cannot be source of Law (dharma), and dharma has an empirical nature. Āpastamba asserts that it is difficult to find absolute sources of law, in ancient books or current people, according to Patrick Olivelle, with "The Righteous (dharma) and the Unrighteous (adharma) do not go around saying, 'here we are!'; Nor do gods, Gandharvas or ancestors declare, 'This is righteous and that is unrighteous'."

Most laws are based on agreement between the Aryas, states Āpastamba, on what is right and what is wrong. Laws must also change with ages, states Āpastamba, a theory that became known as Yuga dharma in Hindu traditions. Āpastamba also asserts in verses 2.29.11-15 a broad minded and liberal view, states Olivelle, that "aspects of dharma not taught in Dharmasastras can be learned from women and people of all classes". The Apastamba Dharmasutra also recognizes property rights of women, and her ability to inherit wealth from her parents. Sita Anantha Raman notes, "As a southerner from Andhra, Āpastamba was familiar with southern customs, including matriliny. He gave importance to the 'married pair' (ĀDS 2.1.7-10) who performed Vedic rites together for the prosperity of the family."

Āpastamba used a hermeneutic strategy to assert that the Vedas once contained all knowledge including that of ideal Dharma, but parts of Vedas have been lost. Human customs developed from the original complete Vedas, but given the lost text, one must use customs between good people as a source to infer what the original Vedas might have stated the Dharma to be. This theory, called the ‘lost Veda’ theory, made the study of customs of good people as a source of dharma and guide to proper living, states Olivelle.

Apastamba has given a strikingly accurate value for $\sqrt{2}$ in his which is correct up to five decimal places. Apastamba in his Sulbasutras provide approximate value of square root of 2 as follows:

$$1 + \frac{1}{3} + \frac{1}{3\times 4} - \frac{1}{3\times 4\times 34} = \frac{577}{408} = 1.41421\overline{56862745098039}.$$

== Commentaries ==
Several ancient commentaries (bhasya) were written on this Dharmasūtra, but only one by Haradatta named 'Ujjvalā' has survived into the modern era. Haradatta, possibly from South India and one who lived in 12th- or 13th-century commented on the praśnas of Āpastamba Gṛhyasūtra as well as Gautama's Dharmasūtra.

Haradatta's commentary on Apastamba Dharmasutra was criticized by Boehtlingk in 1885 for lacking "European critical attitude", a view that modern scholars such as Patrick Olivelle have called unjustified and erroneous because Haradatta was a very careful commentator, far more than Boehtlingk and many other 19th-century Orientalists were.

== See also ==
- Arthashastra
- Manusmriti
- Upanishads
- Vedas
