= Classical Hindu law =

Dharmaśāstra-based legal traditions of Hindus

Classical Hindu law is a category of Hindu law (dharma) in traditional Hinduism, taken to begin with the transmittance of the Vedas and ending in 1772 with the adoption of "A Plan for the Administration of Justice in Bengal" by the Bengal government.

== Practice ==
Law during the classical period was theologically based on the dharmasastra, and dharma which was traditionally delineated by "learned people" or scholars of the Vedas. However, in reality, classical Hindu law was diverse in practice, varying between locations, vocational groups, and castes. Thus, the common source of classical Hindu law was the community and, therefore, laws on a whole were highly decentralized and diverse. These laws were dictated by various corporate groups such as merchant leaders, heads of caste, and kings, and because of the diverse leadership, these laws were particular to a set place. Records of classical Hindu law can be found in the Manu Smriti and other smṛti literature; although, actual court records during this time period are rare.

== Sources ==
Classical Hindu law was theologically based on the Dharmasastras. Traditionally these texts established the rules of dharma which could be found through three sources. Theologically the most important source for dharma was from the śruti or Veda, because it was acknowledged to be of divine origin. If one could not find a particular idea in the Vedas, the Dharmasutras instructed him or her to consult the next source of authority: smṛti followed then by ācāra and in some cases ātmatuṣṭi.

The Law is set forth in the Vedas and the Traditional Texts. When these do not address an issue, the practice of cultured people becomes authoritative. (VaDh 1.4-5)

However, ācāra was the law that was conveyed in actual practice.

=== Śruti ===
Śruti is a section of texts that are learned through hearing and are synonymous with the Vedas. Originally transmitted to ancient Rishis by way of cosmic vibration, the texts are considered the highest form of revelation. Because of their divine origin, the texts were passed orally through the generations by a select group of people who were granted the power to interpret the texts into more tangible laws. Although the texts themselves contain no specific law codes or rules, they are the claimed source for all classical Hindu Laws. These texts contain the four Vedas and the supplementary commentary associated with them.

=== Smṛti ===
Smriti, defined as tradition, is the second source of dharma and specifically refers to the written texts which cite the traditions of lawful virtuous people. These texts include the Dharmasastras. Smriti refers to the collections of acara or customary law wherein learning takes place. Smriti is the testimony of people who know the Vedas and is considered as the secondary Veda. Unlike Sruti, revelation, Smriti is based on memory; specifically those of sages who transmit their memories of traditions onto men as a means of passing down their wisdom. Smriti also represents the complete set of sacred literature: the six Vedangas, the epics (the Mahabharata and the Ramayana) and the Puranas.

=== Ācāra ===
Ācāra is the third source of dharma and refers to the community norms and standards of a particular social group. Traditionally, according to the dharmasastras, these standards are derived from the actions of those so fully learned in the Vedas that all their actions are aligned with Vedic teaching. Such actions are looked towards for example in times when information regarding a particular instance is not found within śruti and smṛti literature. Although theologically the Vedas or śruti literature should be the primary source for information regarding Hindu law, in reality, ācāra provided the basis for the working system of law during the classical period. Along with this shift away from laws directly resulting from the Vedas came the normalization of leaders whose actions are considered ācāra yet are not Vedic scholars. Over time, merchant leaders, heads of caste, and community leaders became the true sources of ācāra and therefore, also became the primary source for rulings within the Hindu law tradition.

=== Ātmatuṣṭi ===
Atmatusti is defined as being what is pleasing to oneself and is considered by some to be the fourth source of dharma. However, only the law codes of Manu and Yājñavalkya cite atmatusti as the fourth source of law. Most scholars do not recognize atmatusti as a source of dharma within Hindu Law because it does not have the same authority as sruti, smriti, and acara. Atmatusti is used as a last resort where a person may only use it if the first three legitimate sources do not address the issue in question.

== Classical Hindu Law in Practice ==
=== Administration ===
Classical Hindu law in practice originates from the community, not state bodies. In this way, particular groups of society began to gain influence in the creation and administration of law. Primary corporate groups, kingships, and Brahmins were the factions which conveyed Hindu jurisprudence in practice. Corporate groups were responsible for legislating law through the conception of social norms; kingships were responsible for the administration of punishment and the worldly Hindu system; and Brahmins were responsible for ritual, penance, and the maintenance of a spiritual Hindu system.

=== Judicial Procedure ===
Evidence of judicial procedure in ancient India was mostly derived from classical Hindu law and religious texts like the Vedas. The king was made to be the ultimate law authority within a court. Ordeals, the divine methods of proof and oaths for simple cases were used to help in the decision-making process, while ultimately basing the decision on different texts like Manu, Yājñavalkya, Dharmaśāstras, Sastras and dharma.
