= Samavartanam =

Hindu rite of passage

The Samavartana (Sanskrit: समावर्तन, Samāvartana), also known as Snāna, is a rite of passage in the ancient texts of Hinduism. Performed at the close of the Brahmacharya period, it marks the graduation of a student from Gurukul (school). It signifies a person's readiness to enter grihastashrama (householder, married life).

== Description ==
Samavartana, or Snana, is the ceremony associated with the end of formal education and the Brahmacharya asrama of life. This rite of passage includes a ceremonial bath. The ceremony marked the end of school, but did not imply immediate start of married life. Typically, significant time elapsed between exiting Brahmacharya and entering the Grihastha stage of life.

Anyone who had completed this rite of passage was considered a Vidya-snataka (literally, bathed in knowledge, or showered with learning), and symbolized as one who had crossed the ocean of learning.

== Ceremony ==
The ceremony was a gathering of students, teacher and guests. The student asked the teacher for any gift (guru-dakshina) he desired, which if specified was the student's responsibility to deliver over his lifetime. Then, after a recitation by the teacher of a graduate's dharma (snataka-dharma) and a fire ritual, the graduate took a ceremonial bath. The ceremony occurred after completion of at least 12 years of school, that is at about age 21 or later.

The Taittiriya Upanishad describes, in the eleventh anuvaka of Shiksha Valli, the snataka-dharma recitation emphasized by the teacher to a graduate at this rite of passage. The verses ask the graduate to take care of themselves and pursue Dharma, Artha and Kama to the best of their abilities. Parts of the verses in section 1.11.1, for example, state:

Never err from Truth,
Never err from Dharma,
Never neglect your well-being,
Never neglect your health,
Never neglect your prosperity,
Never neglect Svādhyāya (study of oneself) and Pravacana (exposition of Vedas).

— Taittirĩya Upanishad, I.11.1

The eleventh anuvaka of Shiksha Valli lists behavioral guidelines for the graduating students from a gurukul:

Be one to whom a mother is as god, be one to whom a father is as god,
Be one to whom an Acharya (spiritual guide, scholars you learn from) is as god,
Be one to whom a guest is as god.
Let your actions be uncensurable, none else.
Those acts that you consider good when done to you, do those to others, none else.

— Taittirĩya Upanishad, I.11.2

The third section of the eleventh anuvaka lists charity and giving, with faith, sympathy, modesty and cheerfulness, as ethical precepts for the graduating students at the Samavartana rite of passage.

== See also ==
- Saṃskāra – a list of rites of passage in Hinduism
- Rites of passage
