= Ācāra =

Concept in Classical Hindu law

Ācāra (Sanskrit: आचार) is a concept used in the context of Classical Hindu law that refers to the customary laws or community norms of a particular social group. These community norms are delineated and put into practice by people who have earned the respect of those within each individual group, such as a community leader or elder. Although in Dharmaśāstra the ideal person who defines the ācāra of a particular place is dictated as one who knows the Vedas or is “learned”, in actual practice this role is often deferred to group leaders along with Vedic scholars. Ācāra is theologically important in Hindu law because it is considered, along with the Vedas (Śruti), and Smriti (traditional texts such as the Dharmaśāstra literature), to be one of the sources of dharma. Particular regional ācāra is believed to be canonized in Dharmaśāstra texts; however scholars differ on the source for the actual accounts found within these texts.

== Ācāra as customary law ==
Customary law within the context of Hindu law is defined as akin to the community norm of a particular region. This form of law encompasses laws that are actually applied to daily life, as opposed to theological laws canonized in texts which are accessible for only a small proportion of the population. In this sense, customary law represents the actual practice of law in classical Hinduism, while laws found in the Vedas, smṛti, and śruti literature represent the theoretical practice.

Ācāra, however, is a particularly narrow scope of customary law. What separates it as a category is that these laws are put into practice by people who hold a particular power over that set group. The power is determined by a theological connection to the divine through a full understanding of Vedic literature. These people are also known in dharma literature as the sadācāra. Although dharmasastra identifies the sadācāra as the ideal person for creating laws because they are so fluent with Vedic knowledge that the laws they choose to enforce are in line with the Vedas, in reality, the power to develop laws shifted over time from Vedic scholars to community leaders whose actions gained the respect of their fellow community members and were distinguished as "good people" even if they lacked direct knowledge of the Vedas.

Eventually, even the laws penned by those not versed in the Vedas were connected back to Vedic literature. According to Mitramiśra, even the customs of Śudra are the dharma for Śudra. This means that each particular group has a different individual dharma they must fulfill. Therefore, as long as the practices of a leader are considered in line with the customs of the community, they are still considered to be pursuing their dharma and therefore are still connected to the Vedas.

== Sadācāra ==
According to the Mimamsa scholar Kumārila, "when good people act according to certain rules and no motive or goal is apparent in the realm of the observable, then this is to be understood as dharma." The "good people" of this definition represent the sadācāra. The "sad" of sadācāra is translated as good which causes sadācāra to translate as the "standards of the good (people)". Sadācāra within dharmasastra literature are people who orientate their actions toward the Veda and therefore their actions and decisions (ācāra) can be used as law. According to smṛti literature, sadācāra are the source of correct living, dharma, and therefore Hindu law, when laws set forth in the Vedas and Traditional texts do not address a particular issue. Several ancient commentators (including Kumārila) go so far as to put forth the claim that practices considered legitimate and recorded in the smṛtis but not found in the Vedas are actually located in a "lost Veda" available to the composers of the Dharma texts but now no longer extant.

== Source of Dharma ==
Many texts within the Hindu Law tradition refer to ācāra as the third source of dharma. Although knowledge about dharma received from the Vedas remains the primary source, the Vedas rarely mention dharma in a practical application for daily living. Because of this, there exist two other sources for dharma which provide more personally applicable directions for the follower's lives. If an answer to a question is not found within the Vedas themselves, the question is then posed to each level of sources until an answer is given.

In descending rank in hierarchy, the sources of dharma are:

1. Vedas (śruti)
2. Traditional Texts (smṛti)
3. Customary Law (ācāra)

The power of ācāra within this hierarchy comes from its ability to connect with the Vedas. This connection comes either through the sadācāra, or leader, who establishes the ācāra because of his knowledge of the Vedas, or through citing an additional text as a source that is itself connected with the Vedas.

== Textual Accounts ==
There are a number of telling references to ācāra in Dharmaśāstra texts which reveal the real importance custom had for the settling of legal disputes. Nārada, for example, states that when something stated in a text on dharma conflicts with custom, custom wins out over the text. Asahāya, in his commentary to this statement, confirms that the texts should never overturn lokācāra, or the "customs of the people." Yājñavalkya 1.156 agrees that what is considered anathema by the people, even if prescribed by the smṛtis, is not to be enforced. Manu 8.41 likewise states that a judge must study the specific laws practiced by castes (jātidharma), particular regions (janapadharma), and families (kuladharma) before making any legal pronouncements relating to them.

Even in rules concerning legal procedure itself, the importance of custom is evidenced. Nārada 1.115 states that the validity of documents, i.e. whether they must be witnessed, written in one's own handwriting, etc., should be determined based on local conventions.

With regard to individual groups' own self-governance, Nārada 10.2-3 requires that the king allow heretical monastic groups (like Jains and Buddhists), guilds, local councils, and other corporate groups to exercise their own laws and customs. According to Yājñavalkya 1.342-343, the king must preserve the customs and conventions of all newly conquered lands as well.

Various scholars hold differing ideas about the origin of the recorded ācāra found in Dharmaśāstra literature such as the Manusmṛti. Some, such as scholar Richard Lariviere, hold that traditional smṛti texts are "records of actual customs and practices found in classical India". These were factual records "recorded whether the compilers of smṛtis agreed with them or not". Although each of the customs recorded within smṛtis were drawn from various times and localities, the importance of recording and compiling them was to integrate the local practices into the larger brahminical sector by connecting them to the Vedas.

A different origin for the textual accounts of ācāra stated by scholar Donald R. Davis Jr., claims the ācāra of the time was not directly recorded verbatim, but instead influenced the scholars who crafted smṛti literature. However, even without the direct approval or recording done by classically defined sadācāra, or Vedic scholars, the community norms of a particular location dictated by their own leaders, who may not be Vedic scholars, remained meaningful. This demonstrates a view in which a particular practice doesn't have to be directly tied to the Veda in order for it to be honored as ācāra.

== Role of Ācāra in Hindu Law ==
Various difficult questions arise in regard to the relative force of śruti, smṛti, and ācāra in Hindu law and numerous rules have been laid down in cases of apparent and real conflicts among them. "Ācāra (customs and usage) are transcendental law, and so are the practices declared in the Veda and the smṛti; therefore a twice-born person desirous of his own welfare should always make effort to follow it." The meaning of ācāra itself has changed over time in Hindu law. In the earliest days, ācāra that was to be followed was that observed or declared by learned Brahmins who were highly moral and selfless. Gradually, however, usage that had no visible secular purpose came to be looked upon as binding. Eventually, even customary norms of Śudras became enforceable by the king. In this manner, ācāra became the actual source of Hindu law in more contemporary times. Commentaries on the śāstras indicate an attempt to reconcile the text law with the actual usages of the people.

== See also ==
- Śāstra pramāṇam in Hinduism
- Common Law
- Law of the land
- Sacred tradition in Christianity
