= Atmatusti =

Source of dharma in Hinduism

Atmatusti is a source of dharma in Hinduism, usually translated into English as being "what is pleasing to oneself." The four sources of dharma are: śruti (Vedas); smṛti, "that which is remembered, tradition: Dharmaśāstra, Puranas, Epics; ācāra, good custom; and ātmatuṣṭi.

== Etymology ==
Atmatusti is usually translated into English as being "what is pleasing to oneself." Other scholars have used different terms to describe atmatusti. For example, Derrett's translation from French to English of Lingat's ‘‘The Classical Law of India’’ has coined the term “inner contentment” in reference to atmatusti. Lingat states that inner contentment can be best understood as "the approval of one's conscious".

== Acceptance within the Hindu tradition ==
The first three sources of law are rooted in the vedas, whereas atmatusti is not. It is because of this that atmatusti, as a fourth source, is not recognized by most scholars due to the lack of legitimacy. Only Manu and Yājñavalkya refer to atmatusti as the fourth source of dharma within the Hindu Law tradition. Textual accounts of Manu's and Yajnavalkya's placement of atmatusti as a fourth source of dharma can be found in The Law Code of Manu 2.6 and The Law Code of Yajnavalkya 1.7. Also, atmatusti does not share the same authority as sruti, smriti, and acara. Atmatusti differs significantly from the other three sources of dharma in that it is not based on an "authority exterior to man"; in other words, an individual is able to create their own authority for any issue not covered under sruti, smriti, and acara. According to Davis, "When the Mimamsa method came to be applied to the texts of the smrti it left very little room for atmatusti. ([Lingat] 1973:6)."

== Textual accounts ==
There are only two instances where Atmatusti is designated as a fourth source of dharma within the dharmasastras.

The first instance comes from The Law Code of Manu or Manava Dharmasastra (MDh). The Laws of Manu are commentaries on the dharmasastras by a sage named Manu and therefore is considered a part of smriti. Because of this, The Law Code of Manu has a great amount of authority. However, Manu's view of Atmatusti as a fourth source of dharma seemingly was not shared universally with other sages; except a sage named Yajnavalkya. This is understood through the lack of other smriti texts or dharmasastra commentaries in which Atmatusti is designated as a fourth source. Manu lists atmatusti along with sruti, smriti, and acara as being “the four visible marks of the law”. Manu's use of the phrase "the four visible marks of law", however, is not explained in relation to atmatusti legitimately being a fourth source of dharma. The significance here is therefore based interpretation. The first textual account of Atmatusti being listed as a fourth source of dharma is as follows:

The root of the Law is the entire Veda; the tradition and practice of those who know the Veda; the conduct of good people; and what is pleasing to oneself. (MDh 2.6)

The second instance comes from The Law Code of Yajnavalkya (YDh). Here Yajnavalkya, in addition to listing Atmatusti as a fourth source, also lists a fifth source of dharma: "the desire born of proper intention." However, Yajnavalkya is the only person to list this fifth source; therefore, its recognition among scholars is almost non-existent. The lack of support within the dharmasastras as a whole shows that the Hindu community, for the most part, did not find Yajnavalkya's fifth source of dharma correctly listed or legitimate. The second textual account of Atmatusti being listed as a fourth source of dharma along with the listing of a fifth source is as follows:

The Veda, tradition, the standards of the good, what is pleasant to one’s own self, [and] the desire born of proper intention—these are the roots of dharma. (YDh 1.7)

== Role of Atmatusti within Hindu Law ==
The appointment of atmatusti as a fourth source can be understood by looking at the hierarchy of the sources. The authority of each source is outlined along with the authoritative relationship the sources have on one another. Sruti, the first source, is superior and has more authority than Smriti and Acara. Smriti, the second source, in turn has authority over Acara, the third source. This is understandable in that the vedic texts are superior to tradition. Hence, it is only when the vedic texts do not provide the necessary dharma needed will tradition or the secondary vedic texts be sought out. And, only when tradition does not provide the dharma on a specific topic should customary laws be looked into. Therefore, Manu appoints atmatusti as a last resort and fourth source of dharma for instances where the vedas, tradition, and customs all do not provide the necessary dharma or law.

Atmatusti creates a guide in which a person does not obey laws because it is what they were told to do, but because the person has reverence for the law. It can be used to do what is a right in the context of legal manners, but it is generally not viewed as a moral compass that believers should follow. However, the legal aims of atmatusti are usually consistent with the Veda, seeing as the person's inner-self is partly built on by the individual's education. Therefore, the atmatusti is closely connected with a more highly acknowledged source of dharma.

== See also ==
- Śāstra pramāṇam in Hinduism

== Sources ==
- Davis, Jr. Donald R. Forthcoming. The Spirit of Hindu Law.
- Davis, Jr. Donald R. “On Atmatusti as a Source of Dharma.” ‘‘Journal of the American Oriental Society’’ 127.3 (2007): 51–68.
- Lingat, Robert (1973), The Classical Law of India, University of California Press
- Olivelle, Patrick. 2004. The Law Code of Manu. New York: Oxford University Press.
