= Śāstra pramāṇam =

Hindu philosophical concept

In Hinduism, Śāstra pramāṇam refers to the authority of the scriptures (śruti, Vedas) with regard to puruṣārtha, the objects of human pursuit, namely dharma (right conduct), artha (means of life), kāma (pleasure) and mokṣa (liberation). Together with smṛti ("that which is remembered, tradition": Dharmaśāstra, Hindu Epics, Puranas), ācāra (good custom), and ātmatuṣṭi ("what is pleasing to oneself"), it provides pramana (means of knowledge) and sources of dharma, as expressed in Classical Hindu law, philosophy, rituals and customs.

The first two are undisputed epistemic sources (pramāṇa), where śruti holds the ultimate or supreme authority as Śāstra pramāṇam, while there is difference of opinion for ācāra and ātmatuṣṭi.

== Etymology ==
Pramāṇa literally means "proof" and is also a concept and field of Indian philosophy. The concept is derived from the Sanskrit pra (प्र), a preposition meaning "outward" or "forth", and root mā (मा) which means "measurement". Pramā means "correct notion, true knowledge, basis, foundation, understand", with pramāṇa being a further nominalization of the word with the suffix ana (अन). Thus, the concept Pramāṇa implies that which is a "means of acquiring prama or certain, correct, true knowledge".

Shastra commonly refers to a treatise or text on a specific field of knowledge. In early Vedic literature, the word referred to any precept, rule, teaching, ritual instruction or direction. In late and post Vedic literature of Hinduism, Shastra referred to any treatise, book or instrument of teaching, any manual or compendium on any subject in any field of knowledge, including religious. It is often a suffix, added to the subject of the treatise, such as Yoga-Shastra, Nyaya-Shastra, Dharma-Shastra, Koka- or Kama-Shastra, Moksha-Shastra, Artha-Shastra, Alamkara-Shastra (rhetoric), Kavya-Shastra (poetics), Sangita-Shastra (music), Natya-Shastra (theatre & dance) and others.

With regard to sāstra pramāṇam is refers to the authority to the Vedic scriptures, as expressed in Bhagavadgita chapter 16, verse 24, where Krishna commands Arjuna to follow the authority of the scriptures:

tasmāt śāstraṁ pramāṇam te kāryākārya vyavasthitau
jñātvā śāstravidhānoktam karma kartumihārhasi

Therefore, let the (vedic) scriptures (śāstraṁ) be your authority (pramāṇam) in determining what should be done and what should not be done.
Understand the scriptural injunctions and teachings, and then perform your actions in this world accordingly. (Note: तस्मात् शास्त्रं प्रमाणं ते कार्याकार्यव्यवस्थितौ । ज्ञात्वा शास्त्रविधानोक्तं कर्म कर्तुमिहार्हसि ॥)

Sruti, smriti, ācāra and ātmatuṣṭi are also the four sources of dharma in classical Hindu law, as expressed in Bhavishya Purana, Brahmaparva, Adhyaya 7:

vedaḥ smṛtiḥ sadācāraḥ svasya ca priyamātmanaḥ
etaccaturvidhaṃ prāhuḥ sākshāddharmasya lakshaṇam

Vedas, smritis, good (approved) tradition and what is agreeable to one's soul (conscience),
the wise have declared to be the four direct evidences of dharma. (Note: वेदः स्मृतिः सदाचारः स्वस्य च प्रियमात्मनः । एतच्चतुर्विधं प्राहुः साक्षाद्धर्मस्य लक्षणम् ॥)

The explanation of that sloka has been given in the digest (nibandha), bāla nibandhādarśa: there in dharma, vedas are the only chief pramāna. Smritis dissect (analyze) the essence of vedas only. Both of them support Sadācāra. Ātmasantuṣṭi that is favourable to all these is (then) dharma pramāna. (Note: तत्र धर्मे मुख्यं प्रमाणं वेद एव। वेदार्थमेव विसकलयन्ति स्मृतिः। तदुभय समर्थितश्च आचारः। तदनुकूलैव च आत्मसन्तुष्टि धर्मे प्रमाणम् ॥)

== Śruti ==
Shruti (Sanskrit: श्रुति, IAST: Śruti, IPA: [ɕɽʊtɪ]) in Sanskrit means "that which is heard" and refers to the body of most authoritative, ancient religious texts comprising the central canon of Hinduism. They are the ultimate epistemic authority or mūla pramāṇa (or prathama pramāṇa). Manusmriti states that Śrutistu vedo vigneyah (Sanskrit: श्रुतिस्तु वेदो विज्ञेय:, lit. means "Know that Vedas are Śruti"). Thus, it includes the four Vedas including its four types of embedded texts—the Samhitas, the Brāhmaṇas, the Araṇyakas and the Upaniṣads. Bhagavad Gita is also referred as Gitopaniṣad, thereby according it the status of Upanishad (i.e. Śruti), even though it is originally part of smṛti.

Vedic Sages such as Baudhayana, Parāśara, Vedavyāsa, Gautama, (Note: Gautama dharmasūtras state that Vedo dharmamūlam tadvidām ca śmṛtiśīle (lit. means "Vedas are primary source of our moral ideals and beliefs. After vedas, the authority of śmṛti is accepted in this respect").) Vaśiṣṭha, (Note: Vaśiṣṭha Dharmasūtra state that śrutismṛti vihito dharmaḥ (lit. means "Vedas and smṛtis taken together have been regarded as source of dharma (of course, the former given the first preference).) Āpastamba, (Note: Āpastamba Dharmasūtram state that vedā eva mūlapramāṇaṃ dharmādharmayoḥ (Sanskrit: वेदा एव मूलप्रमाणं धर्माधर्मयोः, lit. means "Vedas alone is primary source (mūlapramāṇaṃ ) for dharma and adharma.").) Manu, (Note: Manusmriti states that Śrutistu vedo vigneyaḥ (lit. means "Know that Vedas are Śruti").) and Yājñavalkya have adhered this view in their works.

The main schools of Indian philosophy that reject the (epistemic authority of) Vedas were regarded as Nāstika, i.e. heterodox in the tradition.

== Smriti ==
Smriti (Sanskrit: स्मृति, IAST: Smṛti) is considered as the penultimate epistemic authority or dvitīya pramāṇa. Smriti literally means "that which is remembered" and it a body of Hindu texts usually attributed to an author, traditionally written down, in contrast to Śrutis (the Vedic literature) considered authorless, that were transmitted verbally across the generations and fixed. Smriti is a derivative secondary work and is considered less authoritative than Sruti in Hinduism, except in the Mimamsa school of Hindu philosophy. The authority of smriti accepted by orthodox schools, is derived from that of shruti, on which it is based.

The Smrti literature is a corpus of diverse varied texts. This corpus includes, but is not limited to the six Vedāngas (the auxiliary sciences in the Vedas), the Itihasas (i.e. the Mahābhārata and Rāmāyana), the Dharmasūtras and Dharmaśāstras (or Smritiśāstras), the Arthasaśāstras, the Purānas, the Kāvya or poetical literature, extensive Bhasyas (reviews and commentaries on Shrutis and non-Shruti texts), and numerous Nibandhas (digests) covering politics, ethics (Nitisastras), culture, arts and society.

Each Smriti text exists in many versions, with many different readings. Smritis were considered fluid and freely rewritten by anyone in ancient and medieval Hindu tradition.

The authors of 18 smritis are namely, Atri, Viṣṇu, Hārīta, Auśanasī, Āngirasa, Yama, Āpastamba, Samvartta, Kātyāyana, Bṛhaspati, Parāśara, Vyāsa, Śaṅkha, Likhita, (Note: Śaṅkha, Likhita are brothers, and wrote each a smriti separately, and another jointly, and the three now considered as only one work.) Dakṣa, Gautama, Śātātapa and Vaśiṣṭha. Yājñavalkya gives the list of total 20 by adding two more Smritis, namely, Yājñavalkya and Manu. (Note: manvatriviṣṇuhārīta yājñavalkya āṅgirāḥ yamāpastambasamvartāḥ kātyāyanabṛhaspatī parāśaravyāsaśaṅkhalikhita dakṣagautamo śātātapovaśiṣṭhaśca dharmaśastrayojakāḥ (Yājñavalkyasmṛti (1.4, 1.5)) (Sanskrit: मन्वत्रिविष्णुहारीत याज्ञवल्क्योऽङ्गिराः। यमापस्तम्बसम्वर्ताः कात्यायनबृहस्पती॥ पराशरव्यासशङ्खलिखिता दक्षगौतमो।शातातपोवशिष्ठश्च धर्मशस्त्रयोजकाः॥)) Parāśara whose name appears in this list, enumerates also twenty authors, but instead of Samvartta, Bṛhaspati, and Vyāsa, he gives the names of Kaśyapa, Bhṛgu and Prachetas.

== Ācāra ==
Ācāra (Sanskrit: आचार), also siṣṭāchāra or sadāchara, is a concept used in the context of Classical Hindu law that refers to the customary laws or community norms of a particular social group. These community norms are delineated and put into practice by people who have earned the respect of those within each individual group, such as a community leader or elder. Although in Dharmaśāstra the ideal person who defines the ācāra of a particular place is dictated as one who knows the Vedas or is “learned”, in actual practice this role is often deferred to group leaders along with Vedic scholars. Ācāra is theologically important in classical Hindu law because it is considered, along with the Vedas (Śruti), and Smriti (traditional texts such as the Dharmaśāstra literature), to be one of the sources of dharma. Particular regional ācāra is believed to be canonized in Dharmaśāstra texts; however scholars differ on the source for the actual accounts found within these texts.

The Anuśāsana-parva of the Mahabharata states:

dharmaṃ jijñāsamānānāṃ pramāṇaṃ prathamaṃ śrutiḥ
dvitīyaṃ dharmaśāstraṃ tu tṛtīyo lokasangrahaḥ

Those who have the 'desire to know dharma' (dharma jijñāsa), the first pramāṇa is śruti.
The second pramāṇa are the dharmaśāstras (i.e. the dharma part of smṛti). The third reference is as per the custom of the people. (Note: धर्मं जिज्ञासमानानां प्रमाणं प्रथमं श्रुतिः । द्वितीयं धर्मशास्त्रं तु तृतीयो लोकसंग्रहः ॥)

To Parāśara (Note: Parāśarasmṛti (1.20) mentions that śrutismṛtisadācāranirṇetārśca sarvadā (Sanskrit:श्रुतिस्मृतिसदाचारनिर्णेतार्श्च सर्वदा ॥lit. means "Śruti, Smr̥ti and Sadācāra are always the deciders.")), Manu, Yājñavalkya, Vaśiṣṭha and Baudhayana, the virtuous conduct of Śiṣṭas (virtuous learned men) and practice of good men, Sadāchara is the antepenultimate epistemic authority or tṛtīya pramāṇa after Śrutis and Smṛtis. Vaśiṣṭhasmṛti verse 1.4 quotes, tadalabhe śiṣṭāchārah pramāṇam, i.e. only if the relevant references are absent in those both, then Śiṣṭa Āchāra can be considered as Antepenultimate pramāṇa. According to the sage Vaśiṣṭha, Śruti and Smṛti are more important sources than others. The Padma Purana also prescribes as similar view. (Note: The Padma Purana as quoted in Bhakti-Sandarbhah states Śrutismr̥tī mamaivājñe yaste ullaṅghya vartate, Ājñācchedī mama dveṣī madbhakto’pi na vaiṣṇavaḥ (Sanskrit:श्रुतिस्मृती ममैवाज्ञे यस्ते उल्लङ्घ्य वर्तते । आज्ञाच्छेदी मम द्वेषी मद्भक्तोऽपि न वैष्णवः ॥lit. means "Śruti and Smr̥ti are in truth My commands. Whoever transgresses them, disobeys Me and is a hater of Me. Though a devotee, He is not a votary of Viṣṇu.").)

While citing Śiṣṭāgama (Note: upaviṣṭo dharmaḥ prativedam tasyānuvyākhyāsyāmaḥ smārto dvitīyaḥ tṛtīyaḥ śiṣṭāgamaḥ Baudhayana smriti (1.1 to 1-4) (Sanskrit:उपविष्टो धर्मः प्रतिवेदम्। तस्यानुव्याख्यास्यामः। स्मार्तो द्वितीयः। तृतीयः शिष्टागमः।).) (lit. that which has come down from Śiṣṭas) as the antepenultimate authority after Vedas and smirtis by Baudhayana in his smriti (verse 1.5), the Śiṣṭas are defined thus:-Sistas (indeed are those) who are free from envy (vigatamatsarāḥ), free from pride (nirahankārāḥ), contented with a store of grain sufficient for ten days (kumbhīdhānyāḥ), free from covetousness (alolupāḥ), and free from hypocrisy (damba), arrogance (darpa), greed (lobha), perplexity (confusion) and anger (krodha).

Kumarila Bhatta, prominent Mīmāṃsā scholar from early medieval India states in his Tantravartika:

If the practices of good men (Sadāchāra) are not in conflict with what is taught in the veda and smṛti, such practices can be regarded as authoritative in matters relating to dharma, but when there is the least thing repugnant to the teaching of the Veda, then, as there would be a conflict of authorities, the practices cannot be regarded as any authority at all.

== Ātmatuṣṭi ==
Ātmaṣtuṭi is usually translated into English as being "what is pleasing to oneself." The first three sources of law are rooted in the vedas, whereas Ātmatuṣṭi is not. It is because of this that Ātmatuṣṭi, as a fourth source (i.e. caturtha pramāṇa), is not recognized by most scholars due to the lack of legitimacy. Only Manu and Yājñavalkya refer to Ātmatuṣṭi as the fourth source of dharma within the Hindu Law tradition. Textual accounts of Manu's and Yajnavalkya's placement of Ātmatuṣṭi as a fourth source of dharma can be found in The Law Code of Manu 2.6 and The Law Code of Yajnavalkya 1.7. Also, Ātmatuṣṭi does not share the same authority as sruti, smriti, and acara. Ātmatuṣṭi differs significantly from the other three sources of dharma in that it is not based on an "authority exterior to man"; in other words, an individual is able to create their own authority for any issue not covered under sruti, smriti, and acara.

Ātmatuṣṭi is also known as Hṛdayānujña (free will) is mentioned also by Manu, Yājñavalkya and Vishnu distinctly mention this as a or source of moral and religion knowledge. Yājñavalkya goes further step adding good intent (samyaksaṃkalpa) as additional fifth source of Dharma:

śrutiḥ smṛtiḥ sadācāraḥ svasya ca priyam ātmanaḥ
samyaksaṃkalpajaḥ kāmo dharmamūlaṃ idaṃ smṛtam

The source of dharma is declared to be fivefold: 1) śrutiḥ; 2) smṛtiḥ; sadācāraḥ (right conduct); svasya ca priyam ātmanaḥ (one's own benefit) and
5) desire born of purposeful intention (samyaksaṃkalpajaḥ kāmaḥ).

Later, samyaksaṃkalpa (Pali: sammā saṅkappa) was included among the Noble Eightfold Path (āryāṣṭāṅgamārga) putforth by Gautama Buddha.

== Instances of conflict ==
Conflict between different epistemic sources, generally termed as virodha. When there is an instance of conflict between the smriti and the śruti, the śruti shall prevail. (Note: श्रुतिस्मृति विरोधे तु श्रुतिरेव गरीयसी॥ (śrutismṛti virodhe tu śrutireva garīyasī)) Similarly, Whenever there is conflict between different epistemic sources in general, then as per Āpastamba, it is advised to refer more preceding epistemic sources as they hold more authority. In Āpastambasmṛti, it is mentioned as

śrutismṛtipurāṇeṣu viruddheṣu parasparam
pūrvaṃ pūrvaṃ balīyam syāditi nyāyavido viduḥ

Whenever there is mutual conflict between vedas, smṛtis and purāṇas, then the ones well-versed in nyāya suggest that
more preceding epistemic source holds higher weightage (than the later epistemic one) (Note: श्रुतिस्मृतिपुराणेषु विरुद्धेषु परस्परम् । पूर्वं पूर्वं बलीयं स्यादिति न्यायविदो विदुः ॥)

Vedavyasa also holds a similar view in his vyāsasmṛti, verse 1.4

śruti smṛti purāṇām virodho yatra driśyate tatra śrotam pramāṇāstu tayordhvyadhe smṛtirvarā

In cases where conflicts are apparent among veda, smriti and Purana, Veda is the valid authority; and where remaining two (Smriti and Purana) are in conflict, Smriti is the valid authority

== Modern usage and criticism ==
Śāstra pramāṇam has been used by social reformers for 19th century from Bengal such as Ishwar Chandra Vidyasagar. He was the most prominent campaigner for widow remarriage and was supported in this by many wise and elite gentlemen of the society and the first signatory on his application to the then Governor General was Shri Kasinath Dutta, belonging to the Hatkhola Dutta lineage. He petitioned in legislative council and was responsible for Hindu Widows' Remarriage Act, 1856. In the same century, Similar effort from south India was carried by social reformers such as Kandukuri Veeresalingam pantulu (Note: In 1882 Telugu essay on widow remarriage, stri punarvivāha śāstrasangrahamu) and Gurazada Apparao to eradicate social evils.

B. R. Ambedkar has criticized the rigidity of śāstra pramāṇam in Hinduism in his work Annihilation of Caste by attacking especially on Manusmriti. In order to prevent child marriages among Hindus, The Child Marriage Restraint Act was passed in 1929. Śāstra pramāṇam was considered by Hindu pandits appointed by the age of consent committee to fix the age of marriage of girl child and then it was fixed to be 14 later by Sarda Act.

== See also ==
- Pramana
- Prasthanatrayi
- Āstika and nāstika
- Dharma (Buddhism)

== Sources ==
- Davis, Jr. Donald R. Forthcoming. Spirit of Hindu Law
- Lingat, Robert (1973), The Classical Law of India, University of California Press
