= Yugadharma =

Concept in Hindu philosophy

Yugadharma (Sanskrit: युगधर्म, romanized: Yugadharma) is the dharma of an epoch or age in Hindu philosophy. The concept of yugadharma is prescribed to be a reflection of Sanatana Dharma, the eternal dharma that transcends the passage of time.

Hindu texts are categorised into Shruti (such as the Vedas) regarded as timeless in character, and Smriti (such as the Manusmriti), secondary texts that are less authoritative and applicable only for a given period. Sanatana Dharma is based on the Shruti texts, while yugadharma is based on the Smriti texts.

== Literature ==
The Bhagavata Purana states that whatever merit was accrued from the meditation of Vishnu in the Satya Yuga, performing sacrifices in the Treta Yuga, worship in the temple in the Dvapara Yuga, would be achieved by chanting the name of Krishna in the present age of the Kali Yuga.

The Vayu Purana states that whenever yugadharma is not adhered to in a given age, Vishnu incarnates on earth and acts in accordance to the practices of the age.

== Interpretations ==
The current yugadharma for the present age called the Kali Yuga is debated amongst the traditions of Hinduism.

=== Gaudiya Vaishnavism ===
Adherents of Gaudiya Vaishnavism hold the belief that the congregational dancing, singing, and chanting (japa) of the Hare Krishna mantra is the yugadharma to be followed.

=== Sri Vaishnavism ===
Adherents of Sri Vaishnavism hold that the performance of sharanagati through the ritual called panchasamskara is the yugadharma to be followed, according to their interpretation of the Vedas. Another important part of the yugadharma cited from scriptural references is the chanting of the Ashtakashara mantra and the Vishnu Sahasranama. Devotion to Venkateswara, a form of Vishnu, is also regarded to be yugadharma for the Kali Yuga.

== See also ==
- Dharma
- Hindu units of measurement
- Tarakabrahma Mantra
