= Vanaprastha =

One of the ashramas

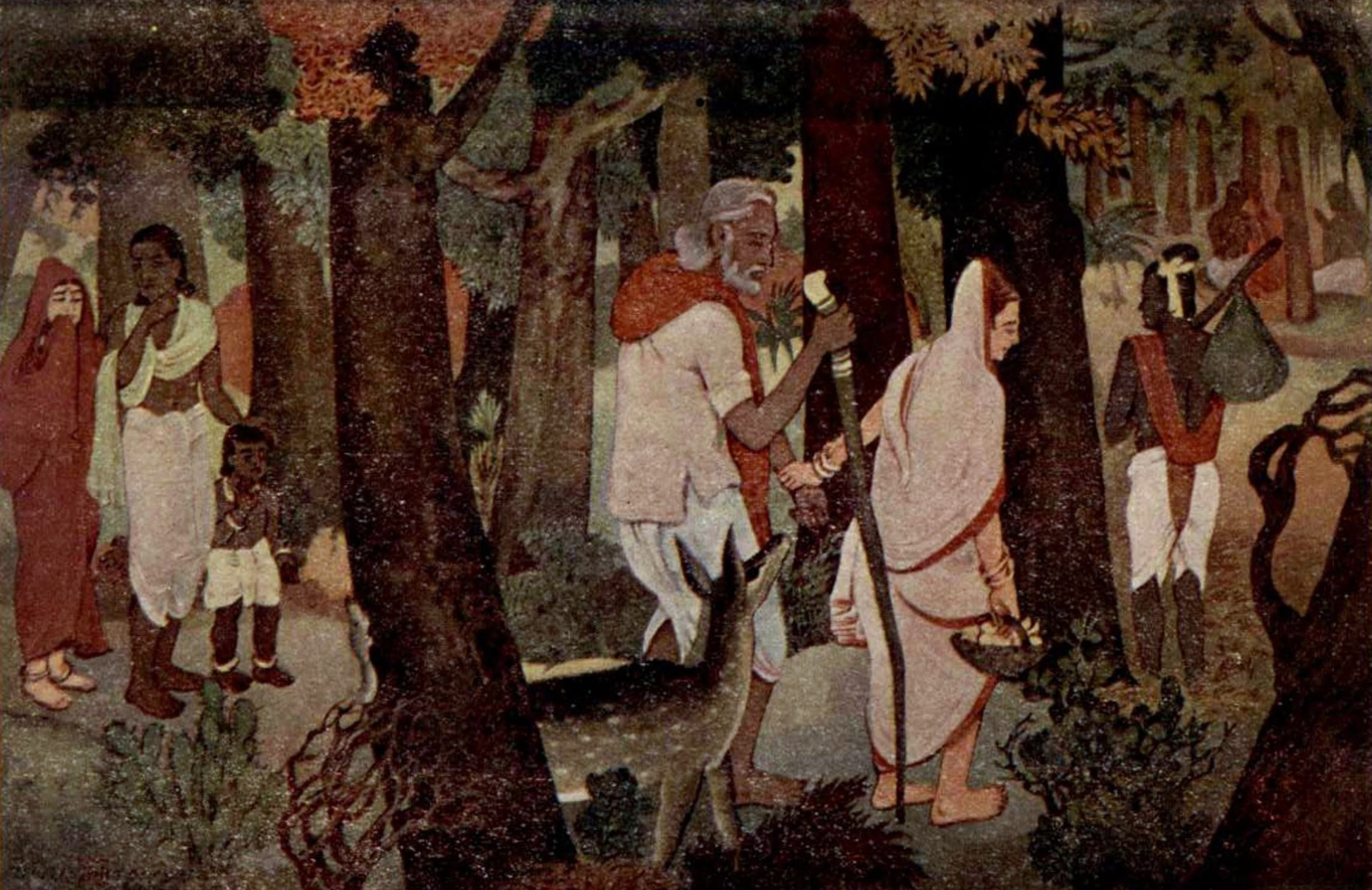
Vānaprastha, a painting by Niharranjan Sen Gupta

Vānaprastha (Sanskrit: वानप्रस्थ) literally meaning 'way of the forest' or 'forest road', is the third stage in the 'Chaturasrama' system of Hinduism. It represents the third of the four ashramas (stages) of human life, the other three being Brahmacharya (bachelor student, 1st stage), Grihastha (married householder, 2nd stage) and Sannyasa (renunciation ascetic, 4th stage).

Vānaprastha is part of the Vedic ashrama system, which starts when a person hands over household responsibilities to the next generation, takes an advisory role, and gradually withdraws from the world. This stage typically follows Grihastha (householder), but a man or woman may choose to skip householder stage, and enter Vānaprastha directly after Brahmacharya (student) stage, as a prelude to Sannyasa (ascetic) and spiritual pursuits.

Vānaprastha stage is considered as a transition phase from a householder's life with greater emphasis on Artha and Kama (pursuits related to wealth and pleasures) to one with greater emphasis on Moksha (spiritual liberation).

== Etymology ==
Vānaprastha (वानप्रस्थ) is a composite word with the roots vana (वन) meaning "forest, distant land", and prastha (प्रस्थ) meaning "going to, abiding in, journey to". The composite word literally means "retiring to forest".

Widgery states that Vānaprastha is synonymous with Aranyaka (Sanskrit: आरण्यक) in historic Indian literature discussing four stages of human life.

== Discussion ==
Vānaprastha is part of the ancient Indian concept called Chaturashrama, which identified four stages of a human life, with distinct differences based on natural human needs and drives. The first stage of life was Brahmacharya (bachelor student) lasting through about 25 years of life, the second stage was Grihastha (married householder) and lasted through about 50 year age. Vānaprastha represented the third stage and typically marked with birth of grandchildren, gradual transition of householder responsibilities to the next generation, increasingly hermit-like lifestyle, and greater emphasis on community services and spiritual pursuit. The Vānaprastha stage ultimately transitioned into Sannyasa, a stage of complete renunciation and dedication to spiritual questions.

Vānaprastha, according to Vedic ashrama system, lasted between the ages of 50 and 74.

Nugteren states that Vānaprastha was, in practice, a metaphor and guideline. It encouraged gradual transition of social responsibility, economic roles, personal focus towards spirituality, from being center of the action to a more advisory peripheral role, without actually requiring someone to actually moving into a forest with or without one's partner. While some literally gave up their property and possessions to move into distant lands, most stayed with their families and communities but assumed a transitioning role and gracefully accept an evolving role with age. Dhavamony identifies Vānaprastha stage as one of "detachment and increasing seclusion" but usually serving as a counselor, peace-maker, judge, teacher to young and advisor to the middle-aged.

While Grihastha and Vānaprastha stages of life were recommended, they were not a requirement. Any Brahmacharya may, if he or she wants, skip householder and retirement stage, go straight to Sannyasa stage of life, thereby renouncing worldly and materialistic pursuits and dedicating their lives to spiritual pursuits.

== Literature ==
History

Jamison and Witzel state early Vedic texts make no mention of life in retirement, or Vānaprastha, or Ashrama system, unlike the concepts of Brahmacharin and Grihasthi which can be distinguished. The earliest mention of a related concept in Rig Veda is of Antigriha (अन्तिगृह, like a neighbor) in hymn 10.95.4, where the context and content suggests the elders did not go into forest, but continued to live as part of extended family, with outwardly role, in ancient India. In later Vedic era and over time, Vānaprastha and other new concepts emerged, while older ideas evolved and expanded. The concept of Vānaprastha, and Sannyasa, emerged about or after 7th century BCE, when sages such as Yājñavalkya left their homes and roamed around as spiritual recluses and pursued their Pravrajika (homeless) lifestyle.

The Dharmasūtras and Dharmaśāstras, composed about mid 1st millennium BCE and later, place increasing emphasis on all four stages of Ashrama system, including Vānaprastha. The Baudhayana Dharmasūtra, in verses 2.11.9 to 2.11.12, describes the four Ashramas including Vānaprastha as "a fourfold division of Dharma". The older Dharmasūtras, however, are significantly different in their treatment of Ashramas system from the more modern Dharmaśāstras, because they do not limit some of their Ashrama rituals to the three varnas – Brahmins, Kshatriyas and Vaishyas. The newer Dharmaśāstra vary widely in their discussion of Ashrama system including Vānaprastha in the context of classes (castes), with some mentioning it for three, while others such as Vaikhānasa Dharmasūtra including all four.

Olivelle posits that the older Dharmasūtras present the Ashramas as four alternative ways of life and options available, but not as sequential stage that any individual must follow. Olivelle also states that Vānaprastha along with the Ashrama system gained mainstream scholarly acceptance about 2nd century BCE.

Spectrum of views

Numerous ancient and medieval texts of India discuss the four stages of a human being. Each offers different perspective. Some are strict and literal, while others discuss the concept in contextual and metaphorical terms. For example, Manusmriti offers elaborate prescriptions for drastic kind of renunciation, describing in verse 6.21 what the retiree in the forest should eat. In contrast, the Mahabharata suggests Vānaprastha is a symbolic metaphor and declares that a king may achieve the "object of Vānaprastha" by certain actions, without retiring into the forest. For example, Shanti Parva (the Book of Peace) of the Hindu Epic, states,

That king, O Yudhishthira, who rescues from distress, to the best of his power, his kinsmen and relatives and friends, attains to the object of the Vanaprastha mode of life. That king who on every occasion honours those that are foremost among men attains the object of the Vanaprastha mode of life. That king, O Partha, who daily makes offerings unto all living creatures including men, attains to the object of the same mode of life. That king, who grinds the kingdoms of others for protecting the righteous, attains to the object of the Vanaprastha mode of life. That king who engages in battle with the resolve of protecting his kingdom or meeting with death, attains to the object of the Vanaprastha mode of life.

— The Mahabharata, Shanti Parva, Section LXVI

Markandeya Purana suggests that a householder, after he has taken care of his progeny, his parents, his traditions and cleansed his mind is ready to enter the third stage of life, or Vānaprastha. He must lead a frugal life during this stage, sleeping on floor, eating only fruits and bulbs. The more he gives up the worldly delights, the closer he gets to the knowledge of his spirit, and more ready he is for the last stage – the Sannyasa asrama, where he renounces everything and focuses entirely on spiritual pursuits.

Vānaprastha appears in many major literary works from ancient India. For example, many chapters of the Hindu Epic Ramayana, just like the Mahabharata, build around hermit-style life in a forest (Vānaprastha). Similarly, the Abhijñānaśākuntalam (Shakuntala play by Kalidasa) revolves around hermit lifestyle in a forest. Many of the legendary forest hermitages, mentioned in various Sanskrit works, later became sites for major temples and Hindu pilgrimage.

Narada Parivrajaka Upanishad identifies four characteristics of a Vānaprastha stage of life as Audumbara (threshold of house, woods), Vaikhanasa (anchorite), Samprakshali (cleansing rituals) and Purnamanasa (contented mind).

Nigal states Vānaprastha stage to be a gradual evolution of a "family man" to a "society man", from one seeking "personal gain" to one seeking a "better world, welfare of his community, agapistic altruism".

== See also ==
- Ashrama (stage)
- Brahmacharya
- Grihastha
- Sannyasa
