= Śānkarasmṛti (Laghudharmaprakrāśikā) =

Śānkarasmṛti (Laghudharmaprakrāśikā) is treatise in Sanskrit dealing with the customs and traditions of the people of medieval Kerala. The work calls itself Laghudharmaprakrāśikā and the term Śānkarasmṛti is not mentioned anywhere in the work. However at the end of every chapter there is a colophon which begins with the words sāṅkare dharmaśāstre which probably gave rise to the tradition of referring to the work as Śānkarasmṛti. The work is originally supposed to contain thirty-six chapters, but only the first twelve chapters have been unearthed. Thus in that sense, the currently available manuscripts of the work are incomplete. The work is about the traditions and customs of Kerala at the time the work was composed. Many of these customs called Keraḷācāra-s are peculiar to Kerala and are not seen among people in other parts of India. At several places in the text, the author of Śānkarasmṛti invokes a certain work titled Bhārgavasmṛiti as the authority for his pronouncements. But unfortunately the work Bhārgavasmṛiti has not so far seen the light of the day, and moreover, in the whole corpus Sanskrit literature, except in Śānkarasmṛti, there is no mention of a work titled Bhārgavasmṛiti. It is believed that Bhārgavasmṛiti must have been a fictitious invention of the author of Śānkarasmṛti.^{a}

== Authorship ==
Traditional scholarship assigns the authorship of Śānkarasmṛti to Adi Shankaracharya, the great philosopher and the most renowned exponent of Advaita Vedanta, who hailed from Kerala. The source of this attribution is a statement in the opening stanza of the text which reads śāṅkareṇa yatātmanā (meaning "Śaṅkara of ascetic disposition"). T. C. Parameswaran Mussatu (who published Śānkarasmṛti with a Malayalam commentary in 1926), Kodungallur Kuññikuṭṭan Tampurān and Kanippayyur Shankaran Namboodiripad are a few of the prominent traditionalists. The modern view which rejected the traditional view was strongly articulated by Ulloor S. Parameswara Iyer, the author of a multi-volume work on the history of Kerala literature. Ulloor S. Parameswara Iyer gave a host of reasons why Adi Shankaracharya could not be the author of Śānkarasmṛti. These include the fact that Adi Shankaracharya's disciples has not mentioned this work in any of their writings, an ascetic of the stature of Adi Shankaracharya is unlikely to dwell upon such mundane matters and the use of the anachronistic term janmi to denote a landlord. Ulloor S. Parameswara Iyer suggests that the author of Śānkarasmṛti should be one Payyūr Śānkaran Nampūtiri who flourished during the 14th century CE. Vaṭakkuṃkūr Rājarājavarma Rāja, K. Kujunni Raja, P. Govinda Pillai, R. Narayana Panikker and S. Venkita Subramnia Iyer are some other scholars who have rejected the traditional view. The modern consensus view can be summarized thus: The author of Śānkarasmṛti is one Śānkaran Nampūtiri hailing from north Kerala who flourished during the 14th-15th century CE.

== Contents ==
The text of Śānkarasmṛti is divided into twelve chapters and each chapter is divided into four parts, called pāda-s. Thus there are a total of 48 pāda-s in the book. The chapters are of varying sizes the shortest one having 87 verses and the longest 158½ verses. There are a total of 1376½ verses. The text does not provide any titles for the chapters, but every pāda is given a title. The work begins by describing the origin of the four varṇa-s and a brief exposition of the duties of the members of the various varṇa-s. These include duties such as "Kṣatriya-s and Vaiśya-s should get up and show obeisance by standing and saluting when a Brahmin approaches, even if the latter is a young boy" and "Śūdra-s generally do not prostrate before of others, but they only stand aside in obeisance with folded hands, as ordained by the rules of Bhārgava".^{b}. The book concludes with a list of sixty-four injunctions (called anācāra-s, meaning "deviations from accepted customs and practices") that should be followed by the people of Kerala. This list of anācāra-s begins with the instruction "One should not cleanse the teeth with sticks" and ends with "She should not die along with her husband (as in sati)".^{c}

The following list of some of the important topics discussed in Śānkarasmṛti is indicative of the nature of contents in the work.

1. Origin and duties of Brāhmins
2. Sapiṇḍa relationship
3. Different types of marriage
4. Marriage procedure
5. Rules for daily bath
6. Duties of husband and wife
7. Sixteen customary rites
8. Adoption
9. Protection of property
10. Protection of fire
11. Smārttavicāra
12. Rules regarding vānaprastha
13. Rules regarding ascetic life
14. Duties of vaiśya-s, śūdra-s
15. Duties of women in mensruation
16. The sixty-four anācāra-s

== Full texts ==
- The full text of Śānkarasmṛti with a commentary in Malayalam by T. C. Paramesvaran Moossad is available in the Internet Archive at the link HERE.
- The full text of Śānkarasmṛti with English translation by N. P. Unni is available in the Internet Archive HERE.

== Notes ==
1. ^a See N. P. Unni, pp. 6-8.
2. ^b See N. P. Unni, pp. 173.
3. ^c See N. P. Unni, pp. 303-306.
