= Smṛti =

Secondary Hindu texts, that which is remembered

Smṛti (Sanskrit: स्मृति, IAST: smṛti, transl. 'what is remembered'), also spelled smriti or smruti, is a body of Hindu texts representing the remembered, written tradition in Hinduism, rooted in or inspired by the Vedas. Smṛti works are generally attributed to a named author and were transmitted through manuscripts, in contrast to Vedic or śruti literature, which is based on a fixed text with no specific author, and preserved through oral transmission. Smṛti texts are derivative, secondary works and are considered less authoritative than śruti in Hinduism, except in the Mīmāmsa school of Hindu philosophy. The authority of smṛti accepted by orthodox schools is derived from that of śruti, on which it is based.

The smṛti literature is a corpus of varied texts that includes: the six Vedāṅgas (the auxiliary sciences in the Vedas), the epics (the Mahābhārata and Rāmāyaṇa), the Dharmasūtras and Dharmaśāstras (or Smritiśāstras), the Arthasaśāstras, the Purāṇas, the kāvya or poetical literature, extensive Bhashyas (reviews and commentaries on śruti and non-śruti texts), and numerous nibandhas (digests) covering politics, ethics (nītiśāstras), culture, arts, and society.

Each smṛti text exists in many versions, with many different readings. Smṛti works were considered fluid and were freely rewritten by anyone in the ancient and medieval Hindu traditions.

== Etymology ==
Smṛti is a Sanskrit word, from the root √smṛ (स्मृ), which means the act of remembering. The word is found in ancient Vedic literature, such as in section 7.13 of the Chandogya Upanishad. In later and modern scholarly usage, the term refers to tradition, memory, and a vast post-Vedic canon of "tradition that is remembered". David Brick states that the original meaning of smriti was simply tradition, and not texts.

Smṛti is also a symbolic synonym for the number 18, derived from the 18 scholars who are credited in Indian tradition with writing dharma-related Smṛti texts (most of which have been lost). These 18 Smṛtis are:

1. Atri
2. Viṣṇu
3. Hārīta
4. Auśanasī
5. Āngirasa
6. Yama
7. Āpastamba
8. Saṃvartta
9. Kātyāyana
10. Bṛhaspati
11. Parāśara
12. Vyāsa
13. Śaṅkha
14. Likhita (Note: Śaṅkha and Likhita are brothers; each wrote a smṛti separately and a third one jointly, and all three are now considered a single work.)
15. Dakṣa
16. Gautama
17. Śātātapa
18. Vaśiṣṭha

Yājñavalkya gives a list of 20 in total by adding two more Smṛtis: Yājñavalkyasmṛti and Manusmṛti. Parāśara, whose name appears in this list, also enumerates 20 authors, but instead of Saṃvartta, Bṛhaspati, and Vyāsa, he lists Kaśyapa, Bhṛgu, and Prachetas.

The Vedic sage Shandilya is also credited with a Smriti text called as Shandilya Smriti. The modern scholar Brahma Dutt Shastri had compiled the text Shandilya Smriti in his six-volume work Smriti Sandarbha.

In linguistic traditions, Smṛti is the name of a type of verse meter. In Hindu mythology, Smṛti is the name of the daughter of Dharma (transl. morality, ethics, law, duty, right living) and Medha (lit. transl. prudence).

== Texts ==
Smṛtis represent the remembered, written tradition in Hinduism. The Smrti literature is a vast corpus of derivative work. All Smṛti texts are regarded to ultimately be rooted in or inspired by Shruti.

The Smṛti corpus includes, but is not limited to:

1. The six Vedāngas (grammar, meter, phonetics, etymology, astronomy and rituals),
2. The Itihasa (lit. transl. so indeed it was), Epics (the Mahābhārata and Rāmāyana),
3. The texts on the four proper goals or aims of human life:
  1. Dharma: These texts discuss dharma from various religious, social, duties, morals and personal ethics perspective. Each of six major schools of Hinduism has its own literature on dharma. Examples include Dharma-sutras (particularly by Gautama, Apastamba, Baudhayana and Vāsiṣṭha) and Dharma-sastras (particularly Manusmṛti, Yājñavalkya Smṛti, Nāradasmṛti and Viṣṇusmṛti). At the personal dharma level, this includes many chapters of Yogasutras.
  2. Artha: Artha-related texts discuss artha from individual, social and as a compendium of economic policies, politics and laws. For example, the Arthashastra of Chanakya, the Kamandakiya Nitisara, Brihaspati Sutra, and Sukra Niti. Olivelle states that most Artha-related treatises from ancient India have been lost.
  3. Kama: These discuss arts, emotions, love, erotics, relationships and other sciences in the pursuit of pleasure. The Kamasutra of Vātsyāyana is most well known. Others texts include Ratirahasya, Jayamangala, Smaradipika, Ratimanjari, Ratiratnapradipika, Ananga Ranga among others.
  4. Moksha: These develop and debate the nature and process of liberation, freedom and spiritual release. Major treatises on the pursuit of moksa include the later Upanishads (early Upanishads are considered Sruti literature), Vivekachudamani, and the sastras on Yoga.
4. The Purānas (lit. transl. ancient, old),
5. The Kāvya or poetical literature,
6. The extensive Bhasyas (reviews and commentaries on Shrutis and non-Shruti texts),
7. The sutras and shastras of the various schools of Hindu philosophy
8. The numerous Nibandhas (digests) covering politics, medicine (Charaka Samhita), ethics (Nitisastras), culture, arts and society.

=== The structure of Smṛti texts ===
The Smṛti texts structurally branched, over time, from so-called the "limbs of the Vedas", or auxiliary sciences for perfecting grammar and pronunciation (part of Vedāngas). For example, the attempt to perfect the art of rituals led to the science of Kalpa, which branched into three Kalpa-sūtras: Srauta-sūtras, Grhya-sūtras, and Dharma-sūtras (estimated to have been composed between 600-200 BCE). The Srauta-sutras became texts describing the perfect performance of public ceremonies (solemn community yajnas), the Grhya-sutras described perfect performance of home ceremonies and domestic rites of passage, and Dharma-sutras described jurisprudence, rights and duties of individuals in four Ashrama stages of life, and social ethics. The Dharma-sūtras themselves became the foundations for a large canon of texts, and branched off as numerous Dharma-sastra texts.

Jan Gonda states that the initial stages of Smṛti texts structurally developed in the form of a new prose genre named Sūtras, that is "aphorism, highly compact precise expression that captured the essence of a fact, principle, instruction or idea". This brevity in expression, states Gonda, was likely necessitated by the fact that writing technology had not developed yet or was not in vogue, in order to store a growing mass of knowledge, and all sorts of knowledge was transferred from one generation to the next through the process of memorization, verbal recitation and listening in the 1st millennium BCE. Compressed content allowed more essential, densely structured knowledge to be memorized and verbally transferred to the next generation in ancient India.

== Role of Smṛti in Hindu Law ==
Smṛtis contribute to exposition of the Hindu Dharma but are considered less authoritative than Śrutis (the Vedic corpus that includes early Upanishads).

=== Earliest Smṛti on Hindu Law: Dharma-sūtras ===
The root texts of ancient Hindu jurisprudence and law are the Dharma-sūtras. These express that Shruti, Smṛti and Acara are sources of jurisprudence and law. The precedence of these sources is declared in the opening verses of each of the known, surviving Dharma-sūtras. For example,

The source of Dharma is the Veda, as well as the tradition [Smriti], and practice of those who know the Veda. – Gautama Dharma-sūtra 1.1-1.2

The Dharma is taught in each Veda, in accordance with which we will explain it. What is given in the tradition [Smriti] is the second, and the conventions of cultured people are the third. – Baudhayana Dharma-sūtra 1.1.1-1.1.4

The Dharma is set forth in the vedas and the Traditional Texts [Smriti]. When these do not address an issue, the practice of cultured people becomes authoritative. – Vāsiṣṭha Dharma-sūtra 1.4-1.5

— Translated by Donald Davis, The Spirit of Hindu Law

=== Later Smṛti on Hindu Law: Dharma-smriti ===
The Smṛtis, such as Manusmṛti, Naradasmṛti, Yājñavalkyasmṛti and Paraśarasmṛti, expanded this definition, as follows,

वेदोऽखिलो धर्ममूलं स्मृतिशीले च तद्विदाम् । आचारश्चैव साधूनामात्मनस्तुष्टिरेव च ॥

Translation 1: The whole Veda is the (first) source of the sacred law, next the tradition and the virtuous conduct of those who know the (Veda further), also the customs of holy men, and (finally) self-satisfaction (Atmanastushti).
Translation 2: The root of the religion is the entire Veda, and (then) the tradition and customs of those who know (the Veda), and the conduct of virtuous people, and what is satisfactory to oneself.

— Manusmriti 2.6

वेदः स्मृतिः सदाचारः स्वस्य च प्रियमात्मनः । एतच्चतुर्विधं प्राहुः साक्षाद् धर्मस्य लक्षणम् ॥

Translation 1: The Veda, the sacred tradition, the customs of virtuous men, and one's own pleasure, they declare to be the fourfold means of defining the sacred law.
Translation 2: The Veda, tradition, the conduct of good people, and what is pleasing to oneself – they say that is four fold mark of religion.

— Manusmriti 2.12

The Yajnavalkya Smṛti includes four Vedas, six Vedangas, Purana, Nyaya, Mimamsa and other sastras, in addition to the ethical conduct of the wise, as sources of knowledge and through which sacred law can be known. It explains the scope of the Dharma as follows,

Rites, proper conduct, Dama (self-restraint), Ahimsa (non-violence), charity, self-study, work, realisation of Atman (Self, Soul) through Yoga – all these are Dharma.

— Yajnavalkya Smriti 1.8

Levinson states that the role of Shruti and Smṛti in Hindu law is as a source of guidance, and its tradition cultivates the principle that "the facts and circumstances of any particular case determine what is good or bad". The later Hindu texts include fourfold sources of Dharma, states Levinson, which include Atmanastushti (satisfaction of one's conscience), Sadacara (local norms of virtuous individuals), Smriti and Sruti.

=== Bhasya on Dharma-smriti ===
Medhatithi's philosophical analysis of and commentary on criminal, civil, and family law in the Dharmaśāstras, particularly the Manusmriti, using Nyāya and Mīmāṃsā theories, is the oldest and the most widely studied tertiary Smṛti. His commentary on the Manusmriti, authored in the 9th century in Kashmir, is called the Manubhāṣya.

== See also ==
- Śānkarasmṛti (Laghudharmaprakrāśikā)
- Smarta
- Śruti
- Shastra
- Sutra
- Yuga dharma
- Śāstra pramāṇam in Hinduism
