= Grihastha =

Second phase of an individual's life in the Hindu ashram system

Gṛhastha (Sanskrit: गृहस्थ) literally means "being in and occupied with home, family" or "householder". It refers to the second phase of an individual's life in the four age-based stages of the Hindu asrama system. It follows celibacy (bachelor student) life stage, and embodies a married life, with the duties of maintaining a home, raising a family, educating one's children, and leading a family-centred and a dharmic social life.

This stage of Asrama is conceptually followed by Vānaprastha (forest dweller, retired) and Sannyasa (renunciation). Combined with other three life stages, Hindu philosophy considers these stages as a facet of Dharma concept, something essential to completing the full development of a human being and fulfilling all the needs of the individual and society.

Ancient and medieval era texts of Hinduism consider Gṛhastha stage as the most important of all stages in sociological context, as human beings in this stage not only pursue a virtuous life, they produce food and wealth that sustains people in other stages of life, as well as the offspring that continues mankind. The householder stage is also considered in Indian philosophy as one where the most intense physical, procreational, emotional, occupational, social and material attachments exist in a human being's life.

In Indian traditions, Gṛhastha stage of life is a recommendation, but not a requirement. Any Brahmachari may, if they want, skip householder and retirement stage, go straight to Sannyasa stage of life, thereby renouncing worldly and materialistic pursuits and dedicating their lives to spiritual pursuits.

== Etymology ==
The Sanskrit word grhastha (गृहस्थ) is a composite grha-stha of two root words grha (गृह) and stha (स्थ). Grha means "home, family, house", while sth means "devoted to, occupied with, being in". Gṛhastha means that which "being in and occupied with home, family" or simply "householder".

== Discussion ==
Gṛhastha is part of the ancient Hindu concept called Chaturashrama, which identified four stages of a human life, with distinct differences based on natural human needs and drives, as well as how these stages integrated with fulfilling, joyful four goals of life called Purushartha - Dharma (piety, morality, duties), Artha (wealth, health, means of life), Kama (love, relationships, emotions) and Moksha (liberation, freedom, self-realization). Gṛhastha is considered to be the most intense of all four stages, where a man or woman pursues all four goals of life, with greater emphasis on first three - Dharma, Artha and Kama. In contrast, Sannyasa is the stage where the individual renounces Artha and Kama, and pursues Moksha with a single minded pursuit.

The stage "Gṛhastha" is preceded by Brahmacharya (student) stage of life, and followed by Vanaprastha (retirement, forest dweller, still an advisor to the next generation) stage. In ancient texts, Gṛhastha stage of life is said to extend from the age of about 25 to about 50.

A man or woman entered the Gṛhastha stage after a Hindu wedding [sacred ceremony]. They would build a home, raise a family, earn wealth, enjoy worldly life and give donations to needy people, poor families, orphans, etc... They also have to follow the 5 great rituals (Pancha Maha Yajnas) as follow:

1. Brahma yajna~ Study of vedas, meditation, prayers
2. Deva yajna~ Offering of clarified butter (ghee) in fire
3. Pitr yajna~ Care of parents, aged and old people
4. Bhuta yajna~ Service to poor, needy, handicapped and animals
5. Atithi yajna~ Hospitality to guest, saints, sages. It is said "Guest is God" - Atithi Devo Bhava. We must take good care of our guest to get good deeds in our life.

== Literature ==
The Chandogya Upanishad and Vedānta Sūtras discuss all four stages of life - student, householder, retired/hermit and ascetic. However they hold Gṛhastha āśrama as the highest because, explains verse III.4.48, not only does the householder performs the duties recommended for all four asramas, they have to produce food and goods on which people in other ashramas survive. The shared duties of four ashramas are - tenderness for all living creatures (ahimsa), self-restraints, and others.

Some chapters of the Upanishads, for example hymn 4.4.22 of Brihadaranyaka Upanishad, specify only three stages of human life – Brahmacharya, Gṛhastha and Vanaprastha. They make no mention of gender, class restrictions on these stages of life. All three stages are recommended as path to Brahman (inner Self, Soul). In contrast, later texts specify four stages of human life.

Dharmasutras and Dharmasmritis

Grihastha ashrama, declares Gautama Dharmasutra in verses 3.2 and 3.3, is the foundation of all the ashramas, and essential to the existence and continuation of society because the other three ashramas do not produce offspring.

Manusmriti, similarly states in Sections VI.87 through VI.90, that it is the householders who feed all those in other three stages of life, and those who seek spiritual pursuits live on, attain fulfillment because of those who accept and prosper in Gṛhastha ashrama. Manusmriti uses the concept of ashrama broadly, and in verses III.77 to III.80, declares Gṛhastha stage as noble, excellent and that "just like all beings need air to survive, so do all beings take life from the Gṛhastha Āśrama because of the food they produce and knowledge they apply".

In Sections IV.1 through IV.6, Manusmriti states a Brahmana, after being twice-born and completing his studies with his teacher, should marry and live in his house. He must seek a means of living that causes no injury or least possible injury to all living beings, except in times of distress. For this householder stage, the text declares that the Brahmana (graduate from Brahmacharya) should accumulate property by ethically pursuing his varna's (class) occupation. Manusmriti lists five appropriate sources of income or means for survival for the educated Brahmana - Ṛta (ऋत, lawful gleaning and gathering, proper natural work), Amrta (अमृत, accepting gifts and charity), Mrta (मृत, begging), Pramrta (प्रमृत, agriculture, tillage) and Satyanrta (सत्यानृत, trade, commerce, money lending). The text disapproves of one means of survival for the householder - Shvavritti (श्ववृत्ति, dog-like subsistence, servitude, slavery).

Puranas

The Vishnu Purana in Book 3 Chapter IX, states

When the scriptural studies appropriate to the student have been completed, and he has received blessings of his Guru, let him enter into the order of the Gṛhastha (householder). Let him pursue and obtain, by ethical ways, home, wife, and wealth, discharge to the best of his ability the duties of his life's stage. He should satisfy the soul of his ancestors with funeral cakes; the gods with oblations; guests with hospitality; the sages with holy study; the progenitors of mankind with progeny; the spirits with reverence; and all the world with words of truth.

— Vishnu Purana, 3.IX.1 - 3.IX.31

Epics

The Indian Epics have extensive debates on Gṛhastha stage of life, offering a contrasting spectrum of views on its merits and nature. An illustrative recommended guidelines for conduct in householder stage of life is stated in Book 1, the Adi Parva of the Mahabharata, as follows,

It hath been said in the oldest Upanishad that a Grihastha (householder), acquiring wealth by honest means, should perform sacrifices; he should always give something in charity, should perform the rites of hospitality unto all arriving at his abode, and should never use anything without giving a portion thereof to others. He should abstain from all vicious acts, should never inflict pain on any creature. It is then only that he can achieve success.

— Adi Parva, The Mahabharata, Chapter 91

== See also ==
Ashramas

- Brahmacharya
- Vanaprastha
- Sannyasa

Puruṣārthas

- Dharma
- Artha
- Kama
- Moksha

Buddhism

- Gahattha (Pali)
