= Āśrama (stage) =

Ancient Indian concept of human life stages

Āśrama (Sanskrit: आश्रम) is a system of stages of life discussed in Hindu texts of the ancient and medieval eras. The four asramas are Brahmacharya (student), Gṛhastha (householder), Vanaprastha (forest walker/forest dweller), and Sannyasa (renunciate).

The asrama system is one facet of the concept of Dharma in Hinduism. It is also a component of the ethical theories in Indian philosophy, where it is combined with the four goals of human life (Purushartha), for fulfilment, happiness and spiritual liberation. Moreover, since the four asramas can be seen as the framework of an influential life-span model, they are also part of an indigenous developmental psychology which from its ancient beginnings until today has shaped the orientations and goals of many people, especially in India.

== History ==
The term asrama originally denoted, according to Patrick Olivelle, originally denoted a physical hermitage inhabited by Vedic householders conducting domestic sacrifices and pursuing a religious life away from settlements. During the fifth century BCE, the term expanded to refer not only to the place where Brahmanical householder resided but also to the way of life they led which could be divided into four stages namely: brahmacharya, grhastha, vanprastha and sannyasa. These four stages came to be known as the four asramas.

In contemporary Hinduism, modern ashrams have evolved from woodland hermitages into institutional centers for maintaining and transmitting religious traditions.

== Asrama system ==
The four-asrama system aimed to integrate renunciation into the Brahmanical society around the fourth century BCE. Initially, it offered young adults four lifelong paths after vedic initiation: Brahmacharya (student), Gṛhastha (householder), Vanaprastha (forest walker/forest dweller), and Sannyasa (renunciate). Documented in early Dharmasutras (2nd-3rd centuries BCE), it allowed individuals to freely choose among these paths, which were viewed as permanent vocations. The term asrama was coined to describe these lifestyles, particularly those of exceptional Brahmins dedicated to austerities and rituals.

Under the Asrama system, the human lifespan was divided into four periods. The goal of each period was the fulfilment and development of the individual. These periods or stages functioned as progressive steps towards achieving ultimate spiritual liberation (moksa).The classical system, as described in the Āśrama Upanishad, the Vaikhanasa Dharmasutra and the later Dharmashastra texts, presents these as sequential stages of human life and recommends ages for entry into each stage, while the original system presented in the early Dharmasutras describes the Asramas as four alternative ways of life, without presenting them as sequential or recommending ages for entry.

Āśrama or stage	Age (years)	Description	Rituals of transition
Brahmacharya (Student's life)	Birth–25	Brahmacharya represented the bachelor student stage of life. This stage focuses on education and included the practice of celibacy. The student went to a Gurukul (family/clan of the guru) and typically would live with a Guru (mentor), acquiring knowledge of science, philosophy, scriptures and logic, practicing self-discipline, working to earn dakshina to be paid for the guru, learning to live a life of Dharma (righteousness, morals, duties).	Upanayana at entry. Samavartana at exit.
Grihastha (household life)	25–50	This stage referred to the individual's married life, with the duties of maintaining a household, raising a family, educating one's children, and leading a family-centred and a dharmic social life. Grihastha stage was considered as the most important of all stages in sociological context, as human beings in this stage not only pursued a virtuous life, they produced food and wealth that sustained people in other stages of life, as well as the offsprings that continued mankind. The stage also represented one where the most intense physical, sexual, emotional, occupational, social and material attachments exist in a human being's life.	Hindu wedding at entry.
Vanaprastha (retired life)	50–75	The retirement stage, where a person handed over household responsibilities to the next generation, took an advisory role, and gradually withdrew from the world. Vanaprastha stage was a transition phase from a householder's life with its greater emphasis on Artha and Kama (wealth, security, pleasure and desires) to one with greater emphasis on Moksha (spiritual liberation).	
Sannyasa (renounced life)	75+ (or anytime)	The stage was marked by renunciation of material desires and prejudices, represented by a state of disinterest and detachment from material life, generally without any meaningful property or home (ascetic), and focused on moksha, peace and simple spiritual life. Anyone could enter this stage after completing the Brahmacharya stage of life.	

== Asrama and Purushartha ==
The Asramas system is one facet of the complex Dharma concept in Hinduism. It is integrated with the concept of Purushartha, or four proper aims of life in Hindu philosophy, namely, Dharma (piety, morality, duties), Artha (wealth, health, means of life), Kama (love, relationships, emotions) and Moksha (liberation, freedom, self-realization). Each of the four Asramas of life are a form of personal and social environment, each stage with ethical guidelines, duties and responsibilities, for the individual and for the society. Each Asrama stage places different levels of emphasis on the four proper goals of life, with different stages viewed as steps to the attainment of the ideal in Hindu philosophy, namely Moksha.

Neither ancient nor medieval texts of India state that any of the first three Asramas must devote itself solely to a specific goal of life (Purushartha). The fourth stage of Sannyasa is different, and the overwhelming consensus in ancient and medieval texts is that Sannyas stage of life must entirely be devoted to Moksha aided by Dharma.

Dharma is held primary for all stages. Moksha is the ultimate noble goal, recommended for everyone, to be sought at any stage of life. On the other two, the texts are unclear. With the exception of Kamasutra, most texts make no recommendation on the relative preference on Artha or Kama, that an individual must emphasise in what stage of life. The Kamasutra states,

The life span of a man is one hundred years. Dividing that time, he should attend to three aims of life in such a way that they support, rather than hinder each other. In his youth he should attend to profitable aims (artha) such as learning, in his prime to pleasure (kama), and in his old age to dharma and moksha.

— Kamasutr 1.2.1–1.2.4, Translated by Patrick Olivelle

== See also ==
- Brahmacharya
- Grihastha
- Hinduism
- Niyamas
- Purushartha
- Sannyasa
- Vanaprastha
- Varna in Hinduism
- Yamas

== General and cited references ==
- Chakkarath, Pradeep (2005). "What Can Western Psychology Learn from Indigenous Psychologies? Lessons from Hindu Psychology". In W. Friedlmeier, P. Chakkarath, & B. Schwarz (Eds.), Culture and Human Development: The Importance of Cross-cultural Research to the Social Sciences (pp. 31–51). New York: Psychology Press.
- Chakkarath, Pradeep (2013). "Indian Thoughts on Psychological Human Development". In G. Misra (Ed.), Psychology and Psychoanalysis in India (pp. 167–190). New Delhi: Munshiram Manoharlal Publishers.
- Kriyananda, Swami (1998). The Hindu Way of Awakening. Crystal Clarity Publishers. ISBN 1-56589-745-5.
- Rama, Swami (1985). Perennial Psychology of the Bhagavad Gita. Himalayan Institute Press. ISBN 0-89389-090-1.
