= Tarakabrahma Mantra =

Taraka Brahma Mantra (Sanskrit: तारकब्रह्ममन्त्र, IAST: Tāraka Brahman Mantra), also is called Rama Taraka Mantra. According to Advaya Taraka Upanishad, it liberates (one) from the fear of womb, birth itself, old age, and death — therefore it is called Tāraka.

== Taraka Brahma ==
According to Rama Rahasya Upanishad Once, the sages Sanaka and others, along with various ṛṣis and devotees of Lord Viṣṇu like Prahlāda, asked Hanumān: ‘O mighty-armed, greatly powerful son of Vāyu! Please tell us — In the eighteen Purāṇas, the eighteen Smṛtis, the four Vedas, all the scriptures, and the entire spiritual knowledge — what is the ultimate Tattva taught for the seekers of Brahman? Among all the names of Viṣṇu, and among Ganesha, Surya, Shiva, and Shakti — what is that one Supreme Tattva?’ Hanumān replied: 'O noble Yogis, revered Ṛṣis, and devoted followers of Viṣṇu! Listen to my words, which destroy the bondage of this world. Among all (the Vedas and scriptures), the supreme truth — the ultimate Tattva — is the liberating principle known as Tāraka Brahma. That Tāraka is none other than Rāma. Rāma alone is the Supreme Brahman. Rāma alone is the embodiment of the highest tapas. Rāma alone is the Supreme Truth. Indeed, Rāma is the Tāraka Brahma.

== Mantra ==
The six-syllabled mantra of Dāśarathi (Rāma) (रां रामाय नमः) is called the Tāraka Brahma. Shiva says O Rama! I impart to your Tāraka mantra, which grants Brahman. Therefore, O Lord of Janaki, you are undoubtedly that Supreme Brahman.

== See also ==
- Ramanama
- Ramayana
