= Vadakkumkur Rajarajavarmaraja =

Sanskrit-Malayalam scholar

- Born: November 27, 1891; Vaikom
- Died: February 27, 1970 (aged 78)
- Occupation: Sanskrit-Malayalam scholar
- Writing career
- Notable awards: Sahithya Rathnam, Vidyabhushanam, Kavithilakan

Vadakkumkur Rajarajavarmaraja (also written as Vadakkumkur Rajaraja Varma Raja) (27 November 1891 - 28 February 1970) was a Sanskrit-Malayalam scholar from the Indian State of Kerala. He has written several great epics, short poems and deep interpretations, all based on stories appearing in classical Sanskrit puranic and other texts. He is known as a great poet, biographer, literary critic, researcher and also as a scientist.

He was born on 27 November 1891 as the son of Vaikom Vazhuthanakkattu Kottarathil Kavukkutty Thampuratty (mother) and Sukapuram Thottupurathu Purushothaman Achyuthan Nambuthiri (father). He had his early formal education in Govt School, Vaikom. He also studied Sanskrit in the traditional style at home. He was associated with the Tranvancore Manuscript Library in several capacities, was a member of Kochi Malayala Bhasha Parishkarana Committee and also has served Kerala Sahithya Academy as an Executive Committee Member. Among his several works, his interpretation of Krishnagatha had wide popularity among Malayalam speaking people.

== Publications ==
The following is a partial list of books authored by Raja.

1. Śr̲imahābhārataṃ
2. Uḷḷūr mahākavi: paṭhanaṃ
3. Mahākavi Rāmapāṇivādan
4. Kēral̥īyasaṃskr̥ta sāhityacaritraṃ
5. Śailīpr̲adīpaṃ
6. Sāhityamañjūṣika
7. Mēpputtūr Nārāyaṇabhaṭṭatiri
8. Uttara Bhārataṃ : mahākāvyaṃ
9. Rāmārjjunīyaṃ campu; savyākhyānaṃ
10. Śr̲ī Vālmīki
11. Sāhityamañjjuṣika
12. Rāmārjjunīyaṃ
13. Sāhitīsarvvasvaṃ : sāhityaśāstr̲agranthaṃ
14. Mahaccaramaṃ : oru vilāpakāvyaṃ
15. Sahithee Sarvaswam

== See also ==
- Vadakkumkur

== Additional reading ==
- "മഹാകവി വടക്കൂംകൂർ രാജരാജ വർമ്മ രാജ - ഒരനുസ്മരണം". രാജു വിളാവത്ത്‌ കൂവ്വപ്പടി. Archived from the original on 5 March 2016.
- Vadakkumkur Rajarajavarmaraja in Malayalam Wikipedia
