= Śruti =

Authoritative scripture of Hinduism

Śruti or shruti (Sanskrit: श्रुति, IAST: Śruti, IPA: [ɕruti]) in Sanskrit means "that which is heard" and refers to the body of most authoritative, ancient religious texts comprising the central canon of Hinduism. Manusmriti states: Śrutistu vedo vijñeyaḥ (Devanagari: श्रुतिस्तु वेदो विज्ञेयः) meaning, "Know that Vedas are Śruti". Thus, it includes the four Vedas including its four types of embedded texts—the Samhitas, the Upanishads, the Brahmanas and the Aranyakas.

Śrutis has been variously described as a revelation through anubhava (direct experience), or of primordial origins realized by ancient Rishis. In Hindu tradition, they have been referred to as apauruṣeya (not created by humans). The Śruti texts themselves assert that they were skillfully created by Rishis (sages), after inspired creativity, just as a carpenter builds a chariot.

All six schools of Hinduism accept the authority of śruti, (Note: Elisa Freschi (2012): The Vedas are not deontic authorities in absolute sense and may be disobeyed, but still recognized as an deontological epistemic authority by a Hindu orthodox school; (Note: This differentiation between epistemic and deontic authority is true for all Indian religions)) but many scholars in these schools have denied that the śrutis are divine. A popular quote on supreme authority is Śruti can be found in Manusmriti (Adhyaya 1, Mantra 132) that Dharmaṃ jijñāsamānānāṃ pramāṇaṃ paramaṃ śrutiḥ (Devanagari: धर्मं जिज्ञासमानानां प्रमाणं परमं श्रुतिः, lit. means "To those who seek the knowledge of the sacred law, the supreme authority is the revelation Śruti."

Shruti (Śruti) differs from other sources of Hindu philosophy, particularly smṛti "which is remembered" or textual material. These works span much of the history of Hinduism, beginning with the earliest known texts and ending in the early historical period with the later Upanishads. Of the śrutis, the Upanishads alone are widely known, and the central ideas of the Upanishadic śrutis are at the spiritual core of Hindus.

== Etymology ==
The Sanskrit word "श्रुति" (IAST: Śruti, IPA: [ɕruti]) has multiple meanings depending on context. It means "hearing, listening", a call to "listen to a speech", any form of communication that is aggregate of sounds (news, report, rumour, noise, hearsay). The word is also found in ancient geometry texts of India, where it means "the diagonal of a tetragon or hypotenuse of a triangle", and is a synonym of karna. The word śruti is also found in ancient Indian music literature, where it means "a particular division of the octave, a quarter tone or interval" out of twenty-two enumerated major tones, minor tones, and semitones. In music, it refers the smallest measure of sound a human being can detect, and the set of twenty-two śruti and forty four half Shruti, stretching from about 250 Hz to 500 Hz, is called the Shruti octave.

In scholarly works on Hinduism, śruti refers to ancient Vedic texts from India. Monier-Williams traces the contextual history of this meaning of śruti as, "which has been heard or communicated from the beginning, sacred knowledge that was only heard and verbally transmitted from generation to generation, the Veda, from earliest Rishis (sages) in Vedic tradition. In scholarly literature, Śruti is also spelled as Shruti.

== Distinction between śruti and smṛti ==
Smriti, literally meaning "that which is remembered," refers to a body of Hindu texts usually attributed to an author. Traditionally written down but constantly revised, Smriti in contrast to Śrutis (the Vedic literature) considered authorless, which were transmitted verbally across the generations and fixed. Smriti is a derivative secondary work and is considered less authoritative than Śruti in Hinduism. While Śruti texts are fixed and their originals preserved better, each Smriti text exists in many versions, with many different readings. In ancient and medieval Hindu tradition, Smritis were considered fluid and freely rewritten by anyone.

Both śrutis and smṛtis represent categories of texts of different traditions of Hindu philosophy. According to Gokul Narang, the Sruti are asserted to be of divine origin in the mythologies of the Puranas. For the people living during the composition of the Vedas the names of the authors were well known. Ancient and medieval Hindu philosophers also did not think that śruti were divine, authored by God.

That Vedas were heard was a notion that was developed by the school or darsana of Pūrva-Mīmāṃsā. The Mīmāṃsā tradition, famous in Hindu tradition for its Sruti exegetical contributions, radically critiqued the notion and any relevance for concepts such as "author", the "sacred text" or divine origins of Śruti; the Mimamsa school claimed that the relevant question is the meaning of the Sruti, values appropriate for human beings in it, and the commitment to it.

Nāstika philosophical schools such as the Cārvākas of the first millennium BCE did not accept the authority of the śrutis and considered them to be human works suffering from incoherent rhapsodies, inconsistencies and tautologies.

Smṛtis are to be human thoughts in response to the śrutis. Traditionally, all smṛtis are regarded to ultimately be rooted in or inspired by śrutis.

== Texts ==
The śruti literature include the four Vedas:

- Rigveda
- Yajurveda
- Samaveda
- Atharvaveda

Each of these Vedas include the following texts, and these belong to the śruti canon:

- Samhitas
- Brahmanas
- Aranyakas
- Upanishads

The literature of the shakhas, or schools, further amplified the material associated with each of the four core traditions.

Of the above śrutis, the Upanishads are most widely known, and the central ideas of them are the spiritual foundation of Hinduism. Patrick Olivelle writes,

Even though theoretically the whole of Vedic corpus is accepted as revealed truth [śruti], in reality it is the Upanishads that have continued to influence the life and thought of the various religious traditions that we have come to call Hindu. Upanishads are the scriptures par excellence of Hinduism.

— Patrick Olivelle

== Role in Hindu Law ==
Shrutis have been considered the authority in Hinduism. Smṛtis, including the Manusmṛti, the Nāradasmṛti and the Parāśarasmṛti, are considered less authoritative than śrutis.

वेदोऽखिलो धर्ममूलं स्मृतिशीले च तद्विदाम्
आचारश्चैव साधूनामात्मनस्तुष्टिरेव च

Translation 1: The whole Veda is the (first) source of the sacred law, next the tradition and the virtuous conduct of those who know the (Veda further), also the customs of holy men, and (finally) self-satisfaction (Atmanastushti). Translation 2: The root of the religion is the entire Veda, and (then) the tradition and customs of those who know (the Veda), and the conduct of virtuous people, and what is satisfactory to oneself.

वेदः स्मृतिः सदाचारः स्वस्य च प्रियमात्मनः एतच्चतुर्विधं प्राहुः साक्षाद् धर्मस्य लक्षणम् Translation 1: The Veda, the sacred tradition, the customs of virtuous men, and one's own pleasure, they declare to be the fourfold means of defining the sacred law. Translation 2: The Veda, tradition, the conduct of good people, and what is pleasing to oneself – they say that is four fold mark of religion.

Only three of the four types of texts in the Vedas have behavioral precepts:

For the Hindu all belief takes its source and its justification in the Vedas [Śruti]. Consequently every rule of dharma must find its foundation in the Veda. Strictly speaking, the Samhitas do not even include a single precept which could be used directly as a rule of conduct. One can find there only references to usage which falls within the scope of dharma. By contrast, the Brahmanas, the Aranyakas and the Upanishads contain numerous precepts which propound rules governing behavior.

— Robert Lingat

Bilimoria states the role of śruti in Hinduism has been inspired by "the belief in a higher natural cosmic order (Rta succeeded later by the concept Dharma) that regulates the universe and provides the basis for its growth, flourishing and sustenance – be that of the gods, human beings, animals and eco-formations".

Levinson states that the role of śruti and smṛti in Hindu law is as a source of guidance, and its tradition cultivates the principle that "the facts and circumstances of any particular case determine what is good or bad". The later Hindu texts include fourfold sources of dharma, states Levinson, which include atmanastushti (satisfaction of one's conscience), sadacara (local norms of virtuous individuals), smṛti and śruti.

== Transmission ==
The śrutis, the oldest of which trace back to the second millennium BCE, had not been committed to writing in ancient times. These were developed and transmitted verbally, from one generation to the next, for nearly two millenniums. Almost all printed editions available in the modern era are copied manuscripts that are hardly older than 500 years. Michael Witzel explains this oral tradition as follows:

The Vedic texts were orally composed and transmitted, without the use of script, in an unbroken line of transmission from teacher to student that was formalized early on. This ensured an impeccable textual transmission superior to the classical texts of other cultures; it is, in fact, something like a tape-recording.... Not just the actual words, but even the long-lost musical (tonal) accent (as in old Greek or in Japanese) has been preserved up to the present.

— Michael Witzel

Ancient Indians developed techniques for listening, memorization and recitation of śrutis. Many forms of recitation or pathas were designed to aid accuracy in recitation and the transmission of the Vedas and other knowledge texts from one generation to the next. All hymns in each Veda were recited in this way; for example, all 1,028 hymns with 10,600 verses of the Rigveda was preserved in this way; as were all other Vedas including the Principal Upanishads, as well as the Vedangas. Each text was recited in a number of ways, to ensure that the different methods of recitation acted as a cross check on the other. Pierre-Sylvain Filliozat summarizes this as follows:

- Samhita-patha: continuous recitation of Sanskrit words bound by the phonetic rules of euphonic combination;
- Pada-patha: a recitation marked by a conscious pause after every word, and after any special grammatical codes embedded inside the text; this method suppresses euphonic combination and restores each word in its original intended form;
- Krama-patha: a step-by-step recitation where euphonically-combined words are paired successively and sequentially and then recited; for example, a hymn "word1 word2 word3 word4...", would be recited as "word1word2 word2word3 word3word4 ...."; this method to verify accuracy is credited to Vedic sages Gargya and Sakalya in the Hindu tradition and mentioned by the ancient Sanskrit grammarian Panini (dated to pre-Buddhism period);
- Krama-patha modified: the same step-by-step recitation as above, but without euphonic-combinations (or free form of each word); this method to verify accuracy is credited to Vedic sages Babhravya and Galava in the Hindu tradition, and is also mentioned by the ancient Sanskrit grammarian Panini;
- Jata-pāṭha, dhvaja-pāṭha and ghana-pāṭha are methods of recitation of a text and its oral transmission that developed after 5th century BCE, that is after the start of Buddhism and Jainism; these methods use more complicated rules of combination and were less used.

These extraordinary retention techniques guaranteed an accurate Śruti, fixed across the generations, not just in terms of unaltered word order but also in terms of sound. That these methods have been effective, is testified to by the preservation of the most ancient Indian religious text, the Ṛgveda (c. 1500 BCE).

This part of a Vedic student's education was called svādhyāya. The systematic method of learning, memorization and practice, enabled these texts to be transmitted from generation to generation with inordinate fidelity.

== See also ==
- Hindu law
- Upanishads
- Vedas
- Śāstra pramāṇam in Hinduism

== External links and further reading ==
- Shruti and other texts (Incomplete), Wikisource
- Upanishads (in Sanskrit, complete list of 108) Wikisource
- Shruti in Hinduism, University of Pittsburgh
- Hindu Scriptures, Berkley Center for Religion, Peace & World, Georgetown University
- Introduction to the Role of Śruti in Hindu Theology, Francis X. Clooney (2014), Journal of Hindu Studies, Vol. 7, No. 1, pages 1–5
- Rambachan, Anantanand (1996). "Scripture as a Source of Knowledge in Hinduism". Journal of Hindu-Christian Studies. 9. doi:10.7825/2164-6279.1127.
- Bilimoria, Purusottama (1984). "The Renaissance Reaction to Śruti". Annals of the Bhandarkar Oriental Research Institute. 65 (1/4): 43–58. JSTOR 41693106.
