= Kautuka =

Ritual protection thread in Hinduism and Jainism

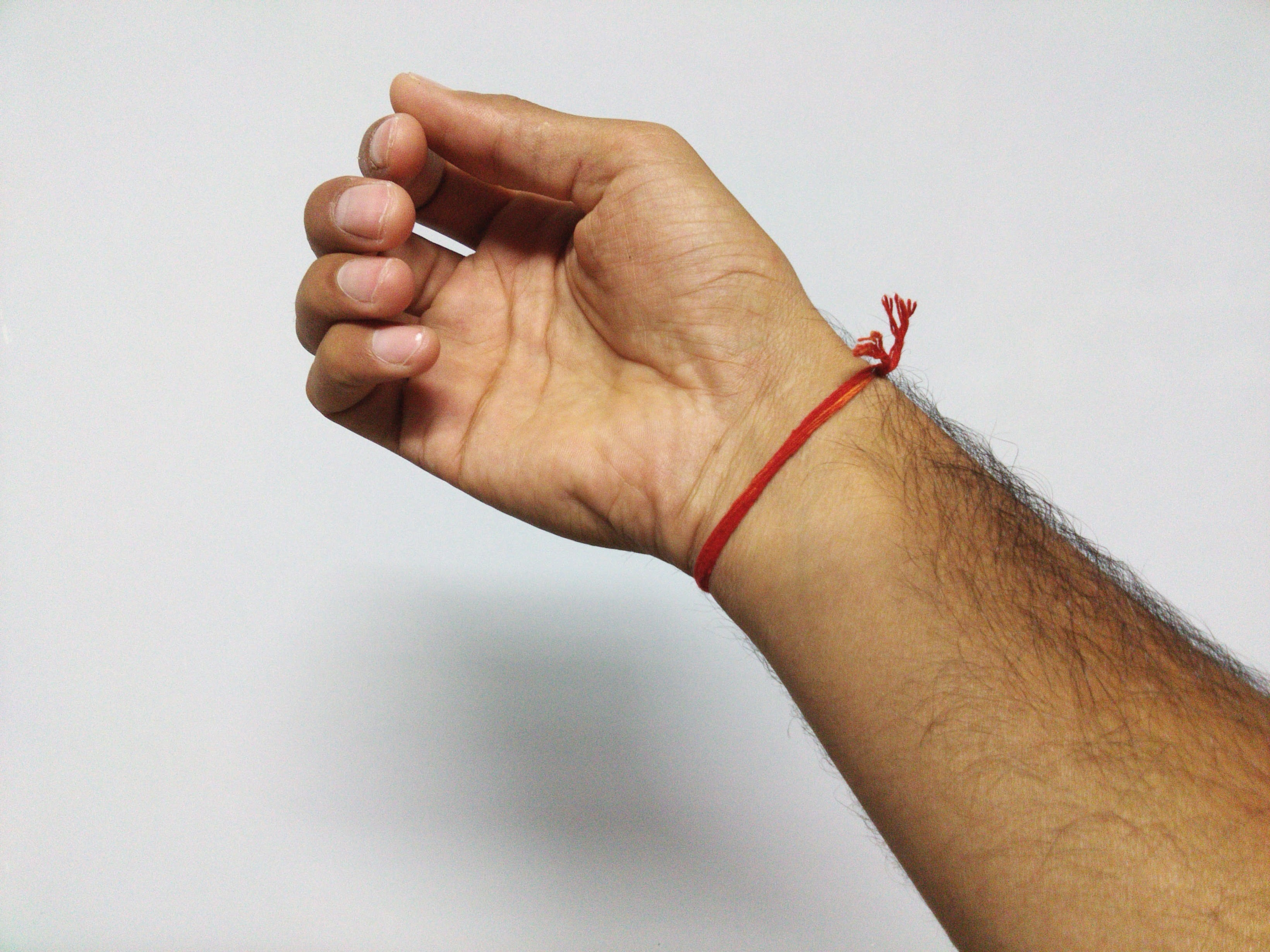
A kautuka thread tied on the wrist.

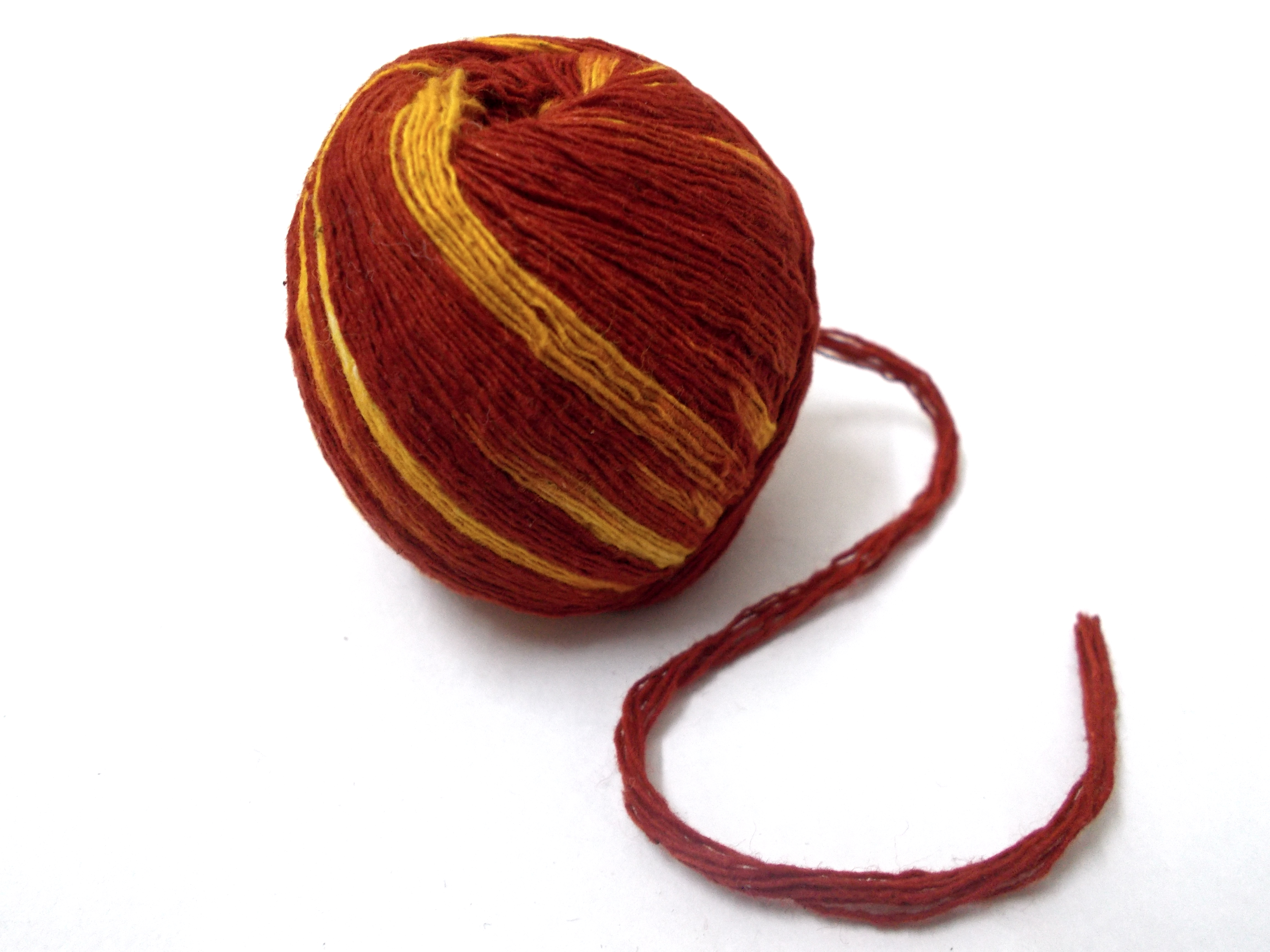
A bundle of kautuka.

A kautuka (Sanskrit: कौतुक, romanized: kautuka) is a red or yellow coloured ritual protection thread, sometimes with knots, found on the Indian subcontinent. It is sometimes called a kalava, mauli, rakshasutra, pratisara (in North India), kaapu, kayiru, charandu or rakshadhara (in South India). A kautuka is a woven thread, cord or ribbon, states the Indologist Jan Gonda, which is traditionally believed to be protective or apotropaeic.

== History ==
The earlier reference to ritual "red and black" colored thread with a dual function, one of driving away "fiends" and the other "binding of bonds" between the bride and the groom by one's relatives appears in hymn 10.85.28 of the Rigveda (c. 1500–1000 BCE), states Gonda.

The kautuka and pratisara in a ritual thread context appear in the Vedic text Atharvaveda Samhita (c. 1200–900 BCE) section 2.11.

== Ritualistic usage ==
=== Description ===
The kautuka is the woven thread in the puja thali (prayer tray). It is typically colored a shade of red, sometimes orange, saffron, yellow or is a mixture of these colors. However, it may also be white or wreathe or just stalks of a grass of the types found in other cultures and believed to offer similar apotropaic value. It is typically tied to the wrist or worn like a necklace, but occasionally it may be worn in conjunction with a headband or turban-like gear. Similar threads are tied to various items and the neck of vessels during a Hindu puja ceremony.

=== Rite of passage or sacrificial rituals ===
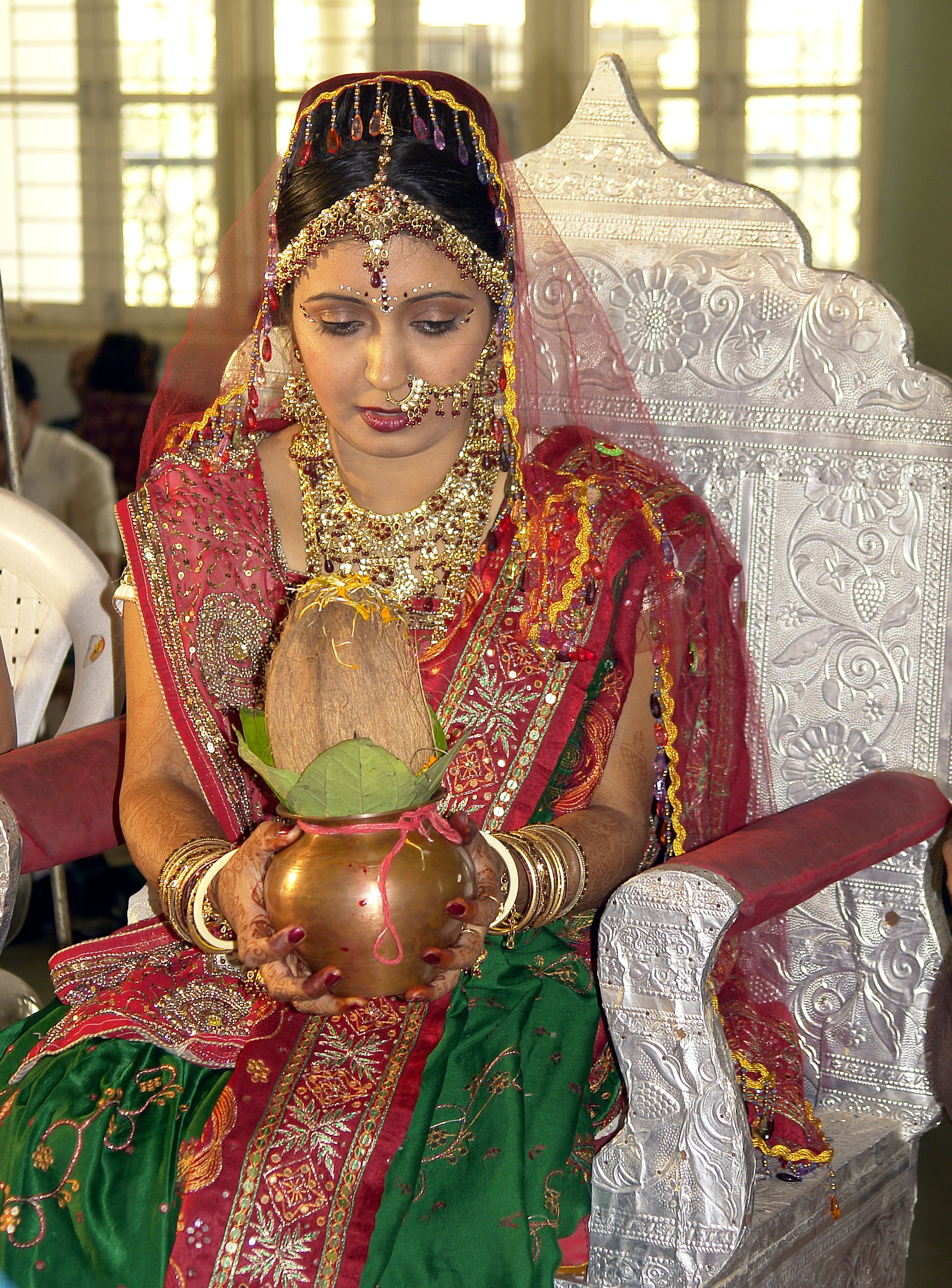
A Hindu bride holding a kalasha. A red kautuka is visible on the neck of the vessel.

A kautuka serves a ritual role in Hinduism, and is tied by the priest or oldest family member on the wrist of a devotee, patron, loved one or around items such as kalasha (vessel) for a rite-of-passage or yajna ritual.

=== Rakhsasutra ===
The rakshasutra (lit. protective thread, also called kautuka or pratisara) is also a part of festive ceremonies and processions, where the protective thread is tied to the wrist of festival icons and human participants. It is mentioned in verses 27.206-207 of the Ajitagama, states the Indologist Richard Davis. Some Hindu texts mention these threads to be a part of the rakshabandhana rite for a temple procession and festive celebrations, recommending woven gold, silver or cotton threads, with some texts specifying the number of threads in a kautuka.

The ritual thread is traditionally worn on the right wrist or arm by the males and on the left by the females. This thread also plays a role in certain familial and marital ceremonies. For example, a red or golden or similarly colored thread is offered by a sister to her brother at Raksha Bandhan. This thread, states the Indologist Jack Goody, is at once a "protection against misfortune for the brother, a symbol of mutual dependence between the sister and brother, and a mark of mutual respect". In a Hindu wedding ceremony, this thread is referred to as kautuka in ancient Sanskrit texts. It is tied to both the bride and the groom, as well as household items such as grinding stone, clay pots and fertility symbols. In South India, it is the priest who ties the kaapu (kautuka) on the groom's wrist, while the groom ties the colored thread on the bride's wrist as a part of the wedding rituals.

== Religious symbolism ==
=== Hinduism ===
==== Vaishnavism ====
In regional Vaishnavism traditions of Hinduism such as those found in Maharashtra, the red-colored thread symbolizes Vishnu for men, and Lakshmi for women, states the Indologist Gudrun Bühnemann. The string typically has no knots or fourteen knots and it is tied to the wrist of the worshipper or garlanded as a necklace. If worn by the wife, it is without knots and is identified with Lakshmi-doraka or Anantī. To the husband, the thread has knots and it symbolizes Ananta (Vishnu).

==== Shaivism ====
The Shaivism tradition of Hinduism similarly deploys auspicious kautuka threads in puja and consecration rituals. For example, during temple construction and worship rituals, the shilpa Sanskrit texts recommend that the first bricks and the lingam be ritually tied with red, golden, saffron, or similarly hued threads. The Shaiva temple architecture texts generally use the term kautuka for this auspicious thread, while Vaishnava texts refer to it as pratisara.

=== Jainism ===
In Jainism, protective threads with amulets are called rakshapotli. Typically red and worn of the wrist, they may sometimes come with a rolled up red fabric that has been blessed by a Jain mendicant using mantras, according to the Indologist M. Whitney Kelting. If worn on the neck, states Kelting, the Jain tradition names the protective amulet after the Jain deity whose blessing is believed to be tied into the knot. The ritual significance of a protective thread between the sisters and brothers as well as during Jain weddings is similar to those in Hinduism.

== See also ==
- Hinduism
  - Upanayana, a sacred thread of Hindus used as rite of passage
  - Upakarma, ritual for changing the worn out Upanayana
  - Sikha, the sacred ponytail
  - Rishi, saint
  - Tagadhari, wearer of Upanayana
- Judaism
  - Bar and Bat Mitzvah, initiation ceremony
  - Red string (Kabbalah), protective red thread Jewish folk tradition
- Zoroastrianism
  - Navjote, Zoroastrian initiation ceremony
  - Kushti, the Zoroastrian sacred thread
- Others
  - Izze-kloth, the Apache Native American sacred cord
