= Daena =

Goddess of good religion and guide to afterlife in Zoroastrianism

Daēnā
- Goddess of religion, Personification of good deeds, Guide to afterlife
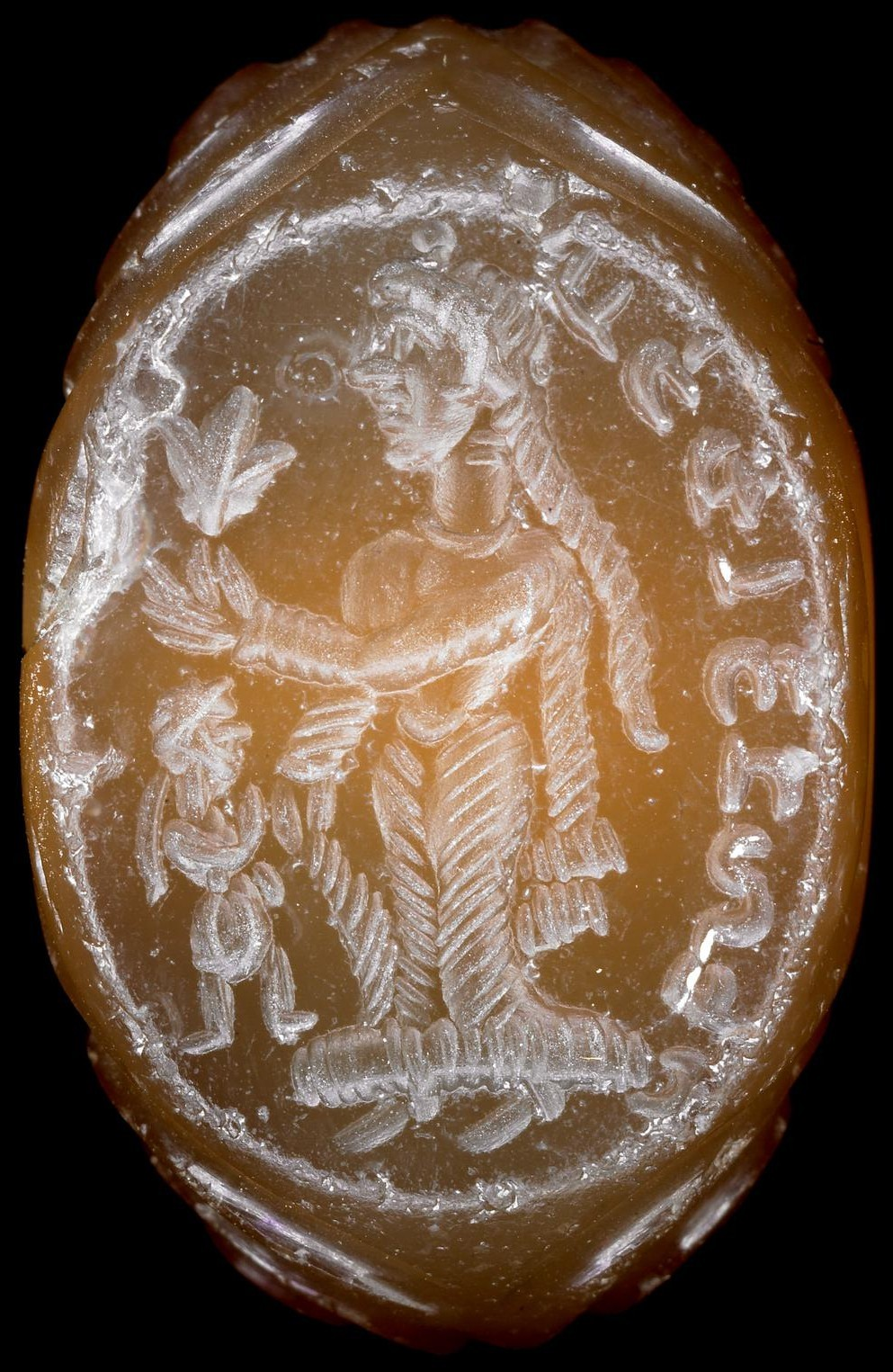
- A Sasanian seal depicting Daēnā.
- Other names: Dēn
- Avestan: Daēnā 𐬛𐬀𐬉𐬥𐬁
- Affiliation: The Thirty-Three Deities, Guardians of the Days of the Month
- Sacred flower: Persian Rose
- Attributes: Goddess of insight, Goddess of vision, Goddess of revelation, Goddess of religion
- Day: 24th of each month in the Iranian calendar
- Gender: Female
- Region: Iran, Central Asia
- Festivals: Navjote
- Associated deities: Rashnu, Mahsarspand, Sraosha, Bahram

Daēnā (Avestan pronunciation: [dʌeːnaː]) is a Zoroastrian concept representing insight and revelation, hence "conscience" or "religion." Alternately, Daēnā is considered to be a divinity, counted among the yazatas. Zoroastrians believe in the concept of Daēnā as the personification of one’s deeds, which serves as a guide for the soul in the afterlife journey.

According to the Avesta, every soul must cross the Chinvat Bridge after death and undergo judgment. Its ultimate destination, whether paradise (Middle Persian: wahišt) or hell (Middle Persian: dušox), is determined by the good and evil deeds performed during its earthly life. Daēnā is portrayed as a fifteen-year-old maiden of extraordinary beauty. She is described as radiant, powerful, perceptive, and skilful, appearing in the company of two dogs. She guides the souls of the righteous over the heights of Mount Hara and leads them across the Chinvat Bridge.

The vivid, humanlike descriptions of Daēnā in Zoroastrian literature have led scholars to identify various female figures in pre-Islamic Iranian art as possible representations of the goddess. Proposed depictions include figures on Sasanian seals, the Sasanian rock relief at Tang-i Qandil, Sogdian ossuaries from Changi and Sivaz, a painting from Dunhuang preserved in the Bibliothèque nationale de France, and several other objects.

== Nomenclature ==
Daēnā is a feminine noun which translates to "that which is seen or observed". In Zoroastrianism: An Introduction to an Ancient Faith, Peter Clark suggests that the term might also be tied to the Avestan root "deh" or "di-" to gain understanding.

The Avestan term 𐬛𐬀𐬉𐬥𐬁 – trisyllabic daēnā in Gathic Avestan and bisyllabic dēnā in Younger Avestan – continues into Middle Persian as Daēnā (𐭣𐭩𐭭) (origin of New Persian دین), which preserves the Avestan meanings. For comparison, it has a Sanskrit cognate dhénā which means thought, but thought in its higher and spiritual reaches. The word Zen, as used in the name of the religious sect of Zen Buddhism, is a sino-xenic rendering of the Chinese word 禪 chán, derived from the Sanskrit cognate dhyāna (see also Dhyāna in Buddhism).

The concept of Daēnā is mentioned in the Gathas, a series of seventeen hymns supposedly written by Zoroaster. Daēnā appears both in the Ahunavaiti Gatha and in the Ushtavaiti Gatha, where it is written that Daēnā is somehow affiliated with the reward that the faithful will receive in the afterlife. However, references to Daēnā in the Gathas are brief, leaving much ambiguity on its nature.

It is speculated that the Daēnā of Zoroastrianism is related to Sanskrit Dharma, also meaning "the Law".

== Conceptualization ==
A Sino-Sogdian depiction of Daēnā, possibly her Manichaean counterpart

Daēnā is understood to encompass a person's spiritual attributes and individuality, including vision, the inner self, conscience, and religion. In Middle Persian literature, Daēnā also frequently refers to an individual's religion. Prods O. Skjærvø, however, interprets the Avestan daēnā as a faculty of perception capable of seeing into the other world, while understanding the Middle Persian Daēnā as the entirety of the transmitted oral tradition. Alberto Cantera similarly translates daēnā as “vision” and argues that this meaning may also be retained in Middle Persian Daēnā. Daēnā also personifies an individual's actions in the earthly world and is among the divine beings most frequently described in human form in Zoroastrian literature.

She is also the eternal law, whose order was revealed to humanity through the Mathra Spenta "Holy Words". Daēnā has been used to mean religion, faith, law, even as a translation for the Hindu and Buddhist term Dharma, often interpreted as "duty" or social order, right conduct, or virtue. The metaphor of the 'path' of Daēnā is represented in Zoroastrianism by the muslin sedreh undershirt, the "Good/Holy Path", and the 72-thread Kushti girdle, the "Pathfinder".

In the Avesta, Daēnā is counted among the essential spiritual components of a person, alongside axw (“vital strength”), baoδah (“perception”), urvan (“soul”), and fravaši (“the everlasting heavenly guardian of material beings”). The concept of Daēnā is closely associated with the vision of the soul, a connection also reflected in its etymology. In this sense, the soul or its image is itself the object of vision. Such visions of the soul (ruwān/urvan) are also found in augural formulas within andarz literature, suggesting a significance extending beyond eschatology. One example occurs in the Čīdag Handarz ī Pōryōtkēšān, in a passage whose interpretation by R. C. Zaehner was challenged by Gherardo Gnoli: ruwān wēn, meaning “looks at the soul.” Similar expressions appear on Sasanian seals, as noted by Philippe Gignoux: lwb'n HZYTN'n (“puisse voir l'âme [ou mon âme]!”) and lwb'n HZYTN (“regarde l'âme!”). These formulas may reflect the close conceptual relationship between ruwān and Daēnā, as well as the notion of the good or beautiful soul, huruwān, and the related term huruwānīg, which was also used in Manichaeism to designate the auditores (niyōšagān).

== The Guide to Afterlife ==
Goddess Daēnā carrying a jar, and flaying over the Chinvat bridge - Panel from the Wirwak sarcophagus

Later Avestan writings, such as the Vendidad, describe the concept of Daēnā further. The Vendidad portrays Daēnā as something of a psychopomp, guiding good and pure souls over the Chinvat Bridge to the House of Song, Zoroastrian paradise, while the wicked are dragged to the House of Lies, a place of punishment. She is described as being finely dressed and accompanied by dogs. If the soul is virtuous, Daēnā guides it toward paradise; if sinful, the corrupt Daēnā drags it down to hell.

In the Hādōxt Nask, Zoroaster asks Ohrmazd where the soul of a righteous person resides on the night of death. Ohrmazd explains that the soul remains near the deceased person's head, clothed in a white garment, and experiences peace and joy throughout the first three nights. At dawn on the fourth day, as the sun rises, a fragrant breeze begins to blow from paradise. The soul then passes among delicately scented flowers, and beholds the luminous and blessed realm of the righteous, filled with fragrant, blossoming flowers, splendour, and xwarrah. The righteous soul's Daēnā appears as a beautiful maiden, holding a flower. The soul asks: “Who are you, the most beautiful of all maidens?” The maiden replies: “O virtuous youth, who has thought, spoken, and acted well, I am your Daēnā, the sum of your deeds.” Flowers also occupy an important place in Zoroastrian religious practice, particularly in rituals commemorating the souls of the deceased.

The Goddess Daēnā on a Sassanian seal

Daēnā has been identified in certain eastern Iranian Sasanian seals as a female figure standing beside two dogs and carrying a jar. The vessel may contain one of the heavenly nourishments described in Zoroastrian texts, such as spring oil, mare's milk, butterfat oil, or sweet whey. These substances are offered to righteous souls as spiritual sustenance after death. However, Zoroastrian texts do not explicitly describe Daēnā offering anything to the righteous soul, although she is expected to carry symbols of the soul's good deeds. A fragment of a Manichaean Sogdian text also describes the journey of righteous souls to paradise, where they encounter a beautiful maiden personifying their deeds, apparently modelled on the Zoroastrian Daēnā. In this account, the maiden carries a vessel containing a drink.

The fate of the wicked soul is markedly different. They experiences distress and appear clothed in tattered and decaying garments. At dawn on the fourth day, rather than encountering a fragrant breeze, the sinful soul finds itself wading through filth and snow. A foul, putrid wind sent by Ahriman from the House of Lies then blows upon it. At this moment, a hideous woman appears, prompting the terrified soul to ask: “Who are you? Never in my life have I seen anyone uglier than you!” She replies: “I am your Daēnā, the embodiment of your deeds. What you have done in life now comes to you in this form.”

Depiction of Daēnā (left)

Daēnā is portrayed as a radiant maiden and guardian who, accompanied by the two dogs watching over the Chinvat Bridge, guides the righteous soul from Mount Alborz across the bridge. She welcomes the soul while bearing the weight of its good deeds upon her shoulders. At the bridge, the soul is greeted by Bahman, who rises from his golden throne and asks: “How did you come from that perilous world to this eternal realm and arrive among us?” With Daēnā's assistance, the soul enters the divine realm and is taught the language of the spiritual world.

In the Middle Persian translation of Vīdēvdāt 19.30, Daēnā is described as possessing dogs (sagōmand), which serve as her guardians (pānag). This has led to the suggestion that, in the Sasanian Zoroastrian tradition, Daēnā was understood to be accompanied and protected by two dogs, possibly reflecting a diminished understanding of the original Avestan text. Shenkar notes that the Sino-Sogdian sarcophagus of Wirkak contains the only known depiction of the two dogs guarding the Chinvat Bridge, shown facing opposite directions.

Dogs occupy a sacred position in Zoroastrian tradition and are associated with Gayōmart, the primordial human. One account describes a sacred dog that protected Gayōmart's body when the Amahraspands could not, and which is subsequently believed to guard the Chinvat Bridge. A later Zoroastrian text mentions a dog called Zarrin-gōš (“golden ears”), possibly identifying it with this guardian. It has therefore been suggested that the two dogs depicted near the bridge in the tenth panel represent Zarrin-gōš, serving as guardians of the crossing and accompanying Daēnā as she escorts the soul.

== See also ==
- Dharma
- Din (Arabic)
- Den Yasht
- Maid of Heaven
