= Tonsure =

Religious shaving of hair on the head

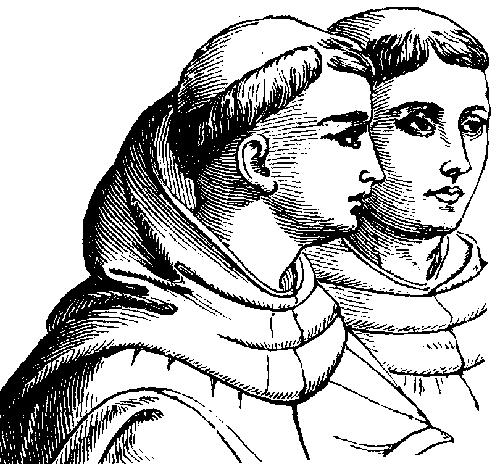
Roman tonsure (Catholicism)

Tonsure (/ˈtɒnʃər/) is the practice of cutting or shaving some or all of the hair on the scalp as a sign of religious devotion or humility. The term originates from the Latin word tonsura (meaning "clipping" or "shearing") and referred to a specific practice in medieval Catholicism, abandoned by papal order in 1972. Tonsure, in its earliest Greek and Roman origin, was used as a sign or signifier for slavery. Tonsure can also refer to the secular practice of shaving all or part of the scalp to show support or sympathy, or to designate mourning. Current usage more generally refers to cutting or shaving for monks, devotees, or mystics of any religion as a symbol of their renunciation of worldly fashion and esteem.

Tonsure is still a traditional practice in Catholicism by specific religious orders (with papal permission). It is also commonly used in the Eastern Orthodox Church for newly baptised members and is frequently used for Buddhist novices, monks, and nuns. The complete shaving of one's head bald, or just shortening the hair, exists as a traditional practice in Islam after completion of the Hajj and is also practised by a number of Hindu religious orders.

== Christianity ==
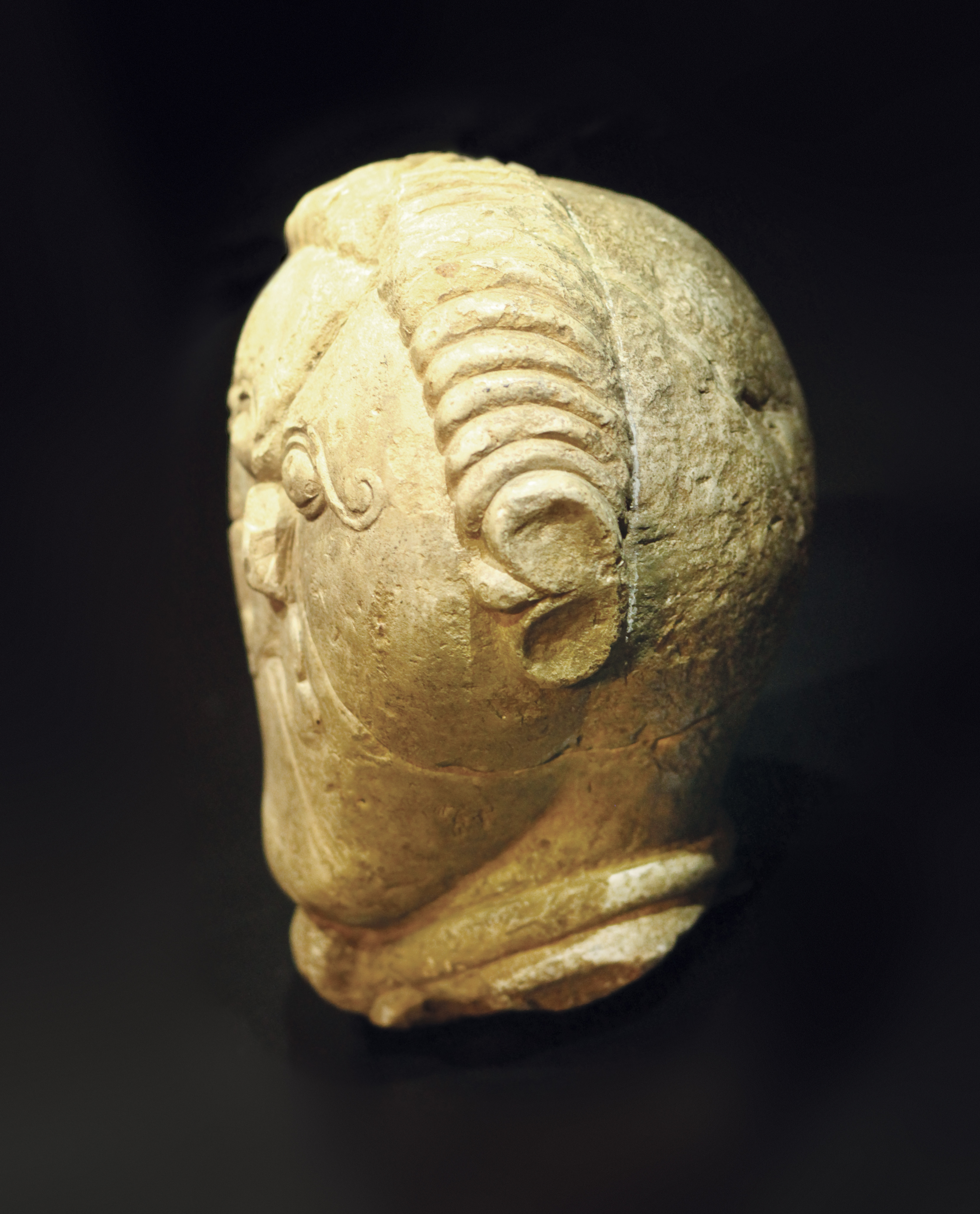
Celtic stone head from ancient Bohemia (150–50 BC), possibly depicting the form of the later Celtic Christian tonsure

=== History and development ===
Tonsure was not practiced by the Early Church, and no records of its use in a Christian context exist prior to the 6th century. There were three forms of tonsure known in the 7th and 8th centuries:

- The Oriental consisted of shaving the whole head. This was observed in the Eastern churches, including the Eastern Orthodox Church and the Eastern Catholic Churches. Hence Theodore of Tarsus, who had acquired his learning in Byzantine Asia Minor and bore this tonsure, had to allow his hair to grow for four months before he could be tonsured after the Roman fashion, and then ordained Archbishop of Canterbury by Pope Vitalian in 668.
- The Celtic tonsure, the exact shape of which is unclear from the sources, but in some way involved shaving the head from ear to ear. The shape may have been semicircular, arcing forward from a line between the ears, but another popular suggestion, less borne out in the sources, proposes that the entire forehead was shaved back to the ears. More recently a triangular shape, with one point at the front of the head going back to a line between the ears, has been suggested. The Celtic tonsure was worn in Ireland and Great Britain and was connected to the distinct set of practices known as Celtic Christianity. It was opposed by the Roman tradition, but many adherents to the Celtic tradition continued to maintain the old way well into the 8th and 9th centuries. Some sources have also suggested links between this tonsure and that worn by druids in the Pre-Roman Iron Age.
- The Roman: this consisted of shaving only the top of the head, so as to allow the hair to grow in the form of a crown. It was the practice of the Latin Church of the Catholic Church, but went into decline after the Middle Ages before finally being abolished by the Pope in 1972. Catholic tradition asserted this tonsure to have originated with Saint Peter; however, there is no evidence for this.

=== Ancient and medieval usage ===
==== Eastern Christianity ====
===== Clerical tonsure =====
St. Germanus I, Patriarch of Constantinople from 715 to 730, writes "The double crown inscribed on the head of the priest through tonsure represents the precious head of the chief-apostle Peter. When he was sent out in the teaching and preaching of the Lord, his head was shaved by those who did not believe his word, as if in mockery. The Teacher Christ blessed this head, changed dishonour into honour, ridicule into praise. He placed on it a crown made not out of precious stones, but one which shines more than gold, topaz, or precious stone – with the stone and rock of faith.” In the Eastern Orthodox Church today, priests, deacons, readers, and other tonsured offices do not have their heads shaved. Rather, four locks of hair are clipped from the top of the head in the shape of a cross to mark their obedience to the Church.

===== Monastic tonsure =====
St. Germanus I writes "The total tonsuring of the head is in imitation of the holy Apostle James, brother of the Lord, and the Apostle Paul, and of the rest."

==== Western Christianity ====
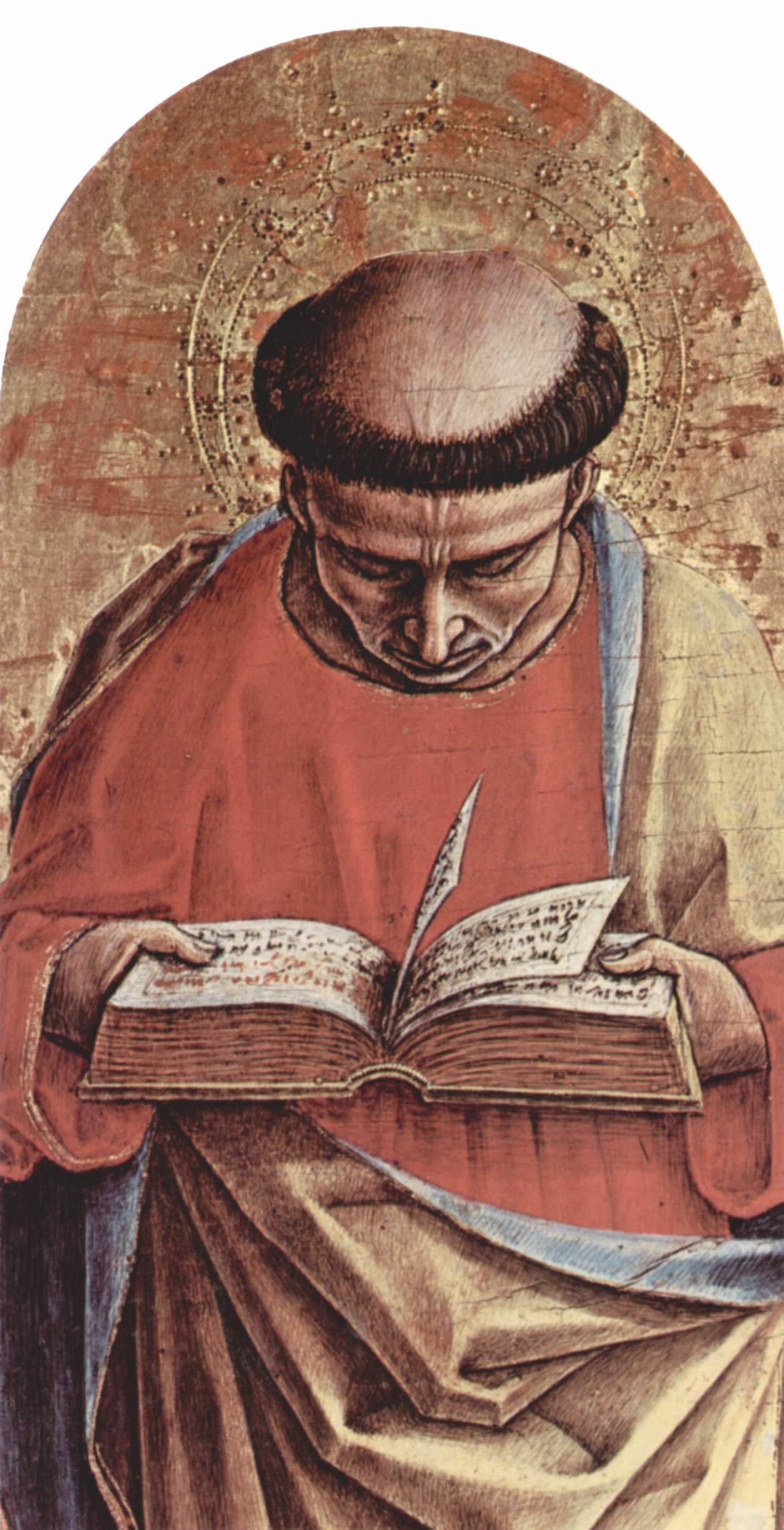
St Bartholomew (by Carlo Crivelli, 1473, in the Ascoli Piceno Cathedral)

===== Clerical tonsure =====
In the Latin Church of the Catholic Church, "first tonsure" was, in medieval times, and generally through to 1972, the rite of inducting someone into the clergy and qualifying him for the civil benefits once enjoyed by clerics. Tonsure was a prerequisite for receiving the minor and major orders. Failing to maintain tonsure was the equivalent of attempting to abandon one's clerical state, and in the 1917 Code of Canon Law, any cleric in minor orders (or simply tonsured) who did not resume the tonsure within a month after being warned by his Ordinary lost the clerical state. Over time, the appearance of tonsure varied, ending up for non-monastic clergy as generally consisting of a symbolic cutting of a few tufts of hair at first tonsure in the Sign of the Cross and in wearing a bare spot on the back of the head which varied according to the degree of orders. It was not supposed to be less than the size of a communicant's host, even for a tonsuratus, someone simply tonsured, and the approximate size for a priest's tonsure was the size of a priest's host. Countries that were not Catholic had exceptions to this rule, especially in the English-speaking world. In England and the United States, for example, the bare spot was dispensed with, likely because of the persecutions that could arise from being a part of the Catholic clergy, but the ceremonious cutting of the hair in the first clerical tonsure was always required. In accordance with Pope Paul VI's motu proprio Ministeria quaedam of 15 August 1972, "first tonsure is no longer conferred".

===== Monastic tonsure =====
Apart from this general clerical tonsure, some Western Rite monastic orders, for example Carthusians and Trappists, employed a very full version of tonsure, shaving the head entirely bald and keeping only a narrow ring of short hair, sometimes called "the monastic crown" (see "Roman tonsure", above), from the time of entrance into the monastic novitiate for all monks, whether destined for service as priests or brothers.

=== Contemporary practice ===
==== Eastern Christianity ====
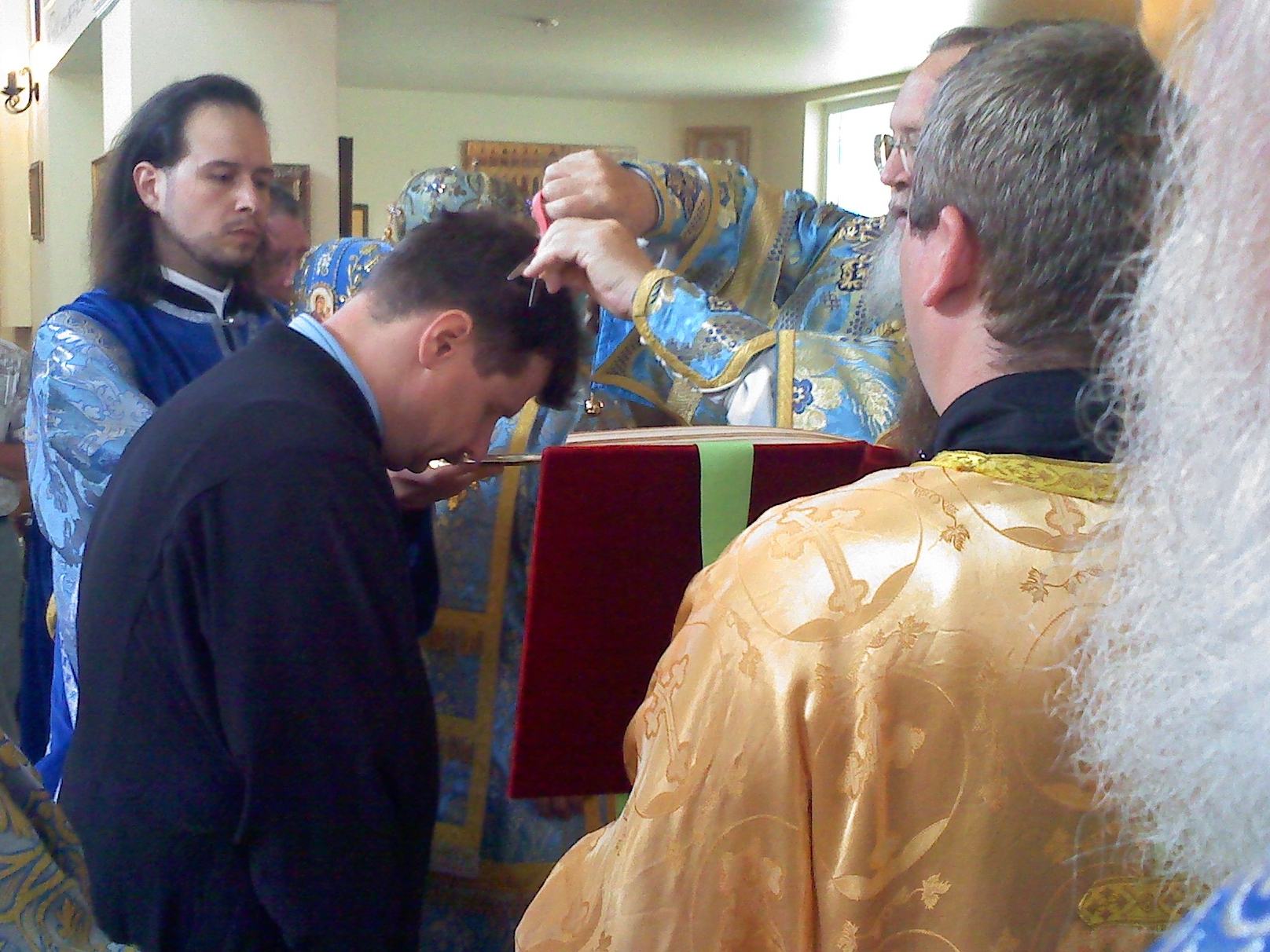
Clerical tonsure (note the scissors in the bishop's hands) of an Orthodox man in conjunction with ordination to minor orders.

Today in Eastern Orthodoxy and in the Eastern Catholic Churches of Byzantine Rite, there are three types of tonsure: baptismal, monastic, and clerical. It always consists of the cutting of four locks of hair in a cruciform pattern: at the front of head as the celebrant says "In the Name of the Father", at the back of head at the words "and the Son", and on either side of the head at the words "and the Holy Spirit". In all cases, the hair is allowed to grow back; the tonsure as such is not adopted as a hairstyle.

===== Baptismal tonsure =====
Baptismal tonsure is performed during the rite of Holy Baptism as a first sacrificial offering by the newly baptised. This tonsure is always performed, whether the one being baptised is an infant or an adult.

===== Monastic tonsure =====
Monastic tonsure (of which there are three grades: Rasophore, Stavrophore and the Great Schema), is the rite of initiation into the monastic state, symbolic of cutting off of self-will. Orthodox monks traditionally never cut their hair or beards after receiving the monastic tonsure as a sign of the consecration of their lives to God (reminiscent of the Vow of the Nazirite).

===== Clerical tonsure =====
Clerical tonsure is the equivalent of the "first tonsure" in the Latin church. It is done immediately prior to ordination to the minor order of reader but is not repeated at subsequent ordinations. This led to a once common usage that one was, for instance, "tonsured a reader", although technically the tonsure occurs prior to the prayer of ordination within the ordination rite.

==== Western Christianity ====
===== Clerical tonsure =====
Since the issuing of Ministeria quaedam in 1972, certain institutes have been authorized to use the first clerical tonsure, such as the Priestly Fraternity of Saint Peter (1988), the Institute of Christ the King Sovereign Priest (1990), and the Personal Apostolic Administration of Saint John Mary Vianney (2001).

Although the tonsure itself is obsolete, the wearing of a skull cap, called a zucchetto, in church to keep the head warm, which the fuller form of clerical tonsure led to, still survives. The zucchetto is worn by the pope (in white), cardinals (in red) and bishops (in purple) both during and outside of formal religious ceremonies. Priests may wear a simple black zucchetto, only outside of religious services, though this is almost never seen except on abbots, who continue to wear the black zucchetto, or abbots of the Order of Canons Regular of Premontre, who wear white. Another congregation of Canons Regular, the Canons Regular of the Lateran, wear a white zucchetto as part of their proper habit. Some priests who held special titles (certain ranks of monsignori and some canons, for instance) formerly wore black zucchettos with red or purple piping, but this too has fallen out of use except in a few, extremely rare cases.

===== Monastic tonsure =====
Some monastic orders and individual monasteries still maintain the tradition of a monastic tonsure. While not required, it is still a common practice of Latin Church friars, such as the Franciscan Missionaries of the Eternal Word. Some references compare the tonsure to the Crown of Thorns worn by Christ at the crucifixion.

== Secular European ==
=== Merovingians ===
Among the Merovingians, whose rulers were the "long-haired kings", the ancient custom remained that an unsuccessful pretender or a dethroned king would be tonsured. Then he had to retire to a monastery, but sometimes this lasted only until his hair grew back. Thus Grimoald the Elder, the son of Pippin of Landen, and Dagobert II's guardian, seized the throne for his own son and had Dagobert tonsured, thus marking him unfit for kingship, and exiled.

=== Byzantine Empire ===
The practice of tonsure, coupled with castration, was common for deposed emperors and their sons in Byzantium from around the 8th century, prior to which disfigurement, usually by blinding, was the normal practice.

== Hinduism ==
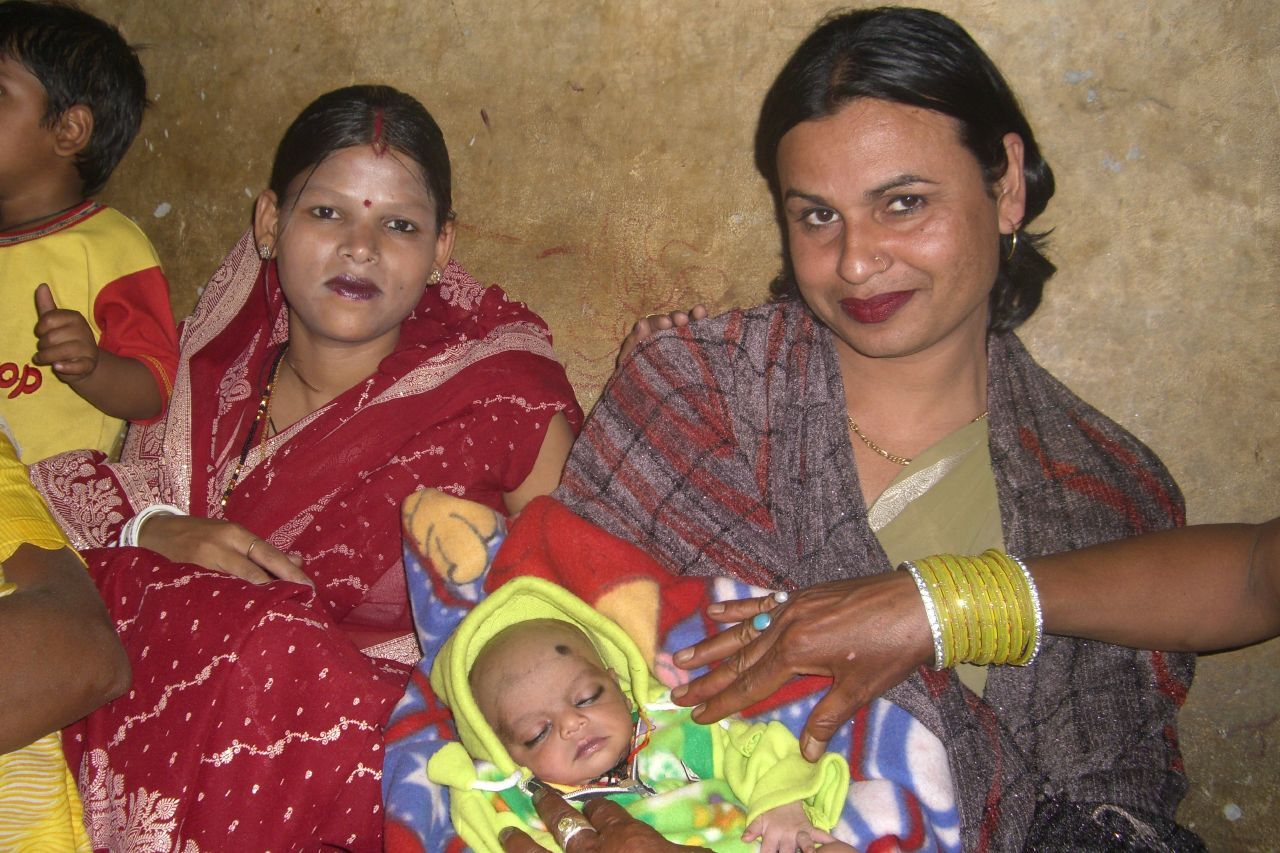
A baby's first haircut, which is often a head shave, is a common rite of passage in Hinduism.

Tonsure is usually the part of three rites of passages in the life of the individual in Hinduism. The first is called chudakarana (IAST: Cūḍākaraṇa, Sanskrit: चूडाकरण; literally, "rite of tonsure"), also known as chaula, chudakarma, mundana, or mundan, marks the child's first haircut, typically the shaving of the head. The mother dresses up, sometimes in her wedding sari, and with the father present, the baby's head is shaven and nails trimmed, washed and dressed in new clothes. Sometimes, a tuft of hair (shikha) is left to cover the soft spot near the top of the baby's head. Both boys and girls typically go through this ceremony, sometimes near a temple or a river, but it is not mandatory in Hinduism.

The significance of the chudakarana rite of passage is the baby's cyclical step to hygiene and cleanliness. The ritual is typically done about the first birthday, but some texts recommend that it be completed before the third or the seventh year. Sometimes, this ritual is combined with the rite of passage of Upanayana, the initiation to formal schooling.

Another rite of passage where tonsure is practised by Hindus is after the death and completing the last rites of an immediate family member, that is father, mother, brother, sister, spouse, or child. This ritual is regionally found in India among male mourners, who shave their heads as a sign of bereavement. Until a few decades ago, many Hindu communities, especially the upper castes, forced widows to undergo the ritual of tonsure and shun good clothes and ornaments, in order to make them unattractive to men.

According to Jamanadas, tonsure was originally a Buddhist custom and was adopted by Hinduism. However, Pandey and others trace the practice to Sanskrit texts dated to have been composed before the birth of Buddha, which mention tonsure as a rite of passage.

Since the 1960s, unbeknownst to most pilgrims, temples have gathered, cleaned, and sold tonsured hair to the commercial hair market in order to fund their activities. In 2019, Tirumala temple gathered and sold 157 tons of tonsured hair for $1.6 million. Tonsured hair is among the most valuable in the world for wigs and artificial hair extensions and a major export from India, which exported $770 million in 2021.

== Buddhism ==
In Buddhism, tonsure (Sanskrit: mundanā) is a part of the rite of pravrajya and also a part of becoming a bhikshu (monk) or bhikshuni (nun). This involves shaving the head and face. This tonsure is renewed as often as required to keep the head cleanly shaven.

The Theravada Vinaya stipulates that a monk must shave every two months or when the hair grows two finger-breadths in length. When the Buddha-to-be first cut his hair, the remaining hair curled clockwise to this length, never to grow long again. It is common for the monastic community to shave during the full moon and new moon Uposatha days.

Mahayana tradition varies slightly in its forms of tonsure depending on region. According to the Dharmaguptaka Vinaya commentary (四分律刪繁補闕行事鈔, T. 1804) by Daoxuan, newly-ordained monks should leave one, three, or five small knots of hair (cūḍā) that are ceremonially shaved by their teacher when receiving precepts. Chinese Buddhism includes a practice called jieba (戒疤), wherein the monk or nun receives small burns to the scalp to symbolize their adherence to the bodhisattva path.

The Verse of Tonsure (Teihatsu no ge 剃髮偈) is recited by Soto Zen practitioners:

In shaving off beard and hair, (teijo shuhatsu 剃除鬚髮; Sanskrit: śiras-tuṇḍa-muṇḍana)
we pray that all living beings (tōgan shujō 當願衆生)
should forever be free from mental afflictions (yōri bonnō 永離煩惱)
and in the end attain nirvana. (kugyō jakumetsu 究竟寂滅; Sanskrit: atyanta-śānta-praśānta)

Tibetan Buddhist tradition assigns auspicious days depending on when both laypeople and monastics cut their hair. The Mūlasarvāstivāda Vinaya also regulates the wearing of a special cloth when shaving the head called keśapratigrahaṇa (剃髮衣). This is also the name of the shrine built for the Buddha's hair before it was enshrined in a stupa in Trāyastriṃśa heaven.

== Judaism ==
The purification process of the metzora (one afflicted with tzaraath) involved the ritual shaving of the metzorah's entire body except for the afflicted locations.

In an effort to distinguish themselves from ancient practices of tonsure associated with idolatry, by doing the inverse, Orthodox Jewish males do not shave the corners of their beards or scalps with straight blades, as described in Leviticus 19:27.

See also the custom of Upsherin, celebrating a boy's first haircut at the age of three.

== Islam ==
=== Sunni ===
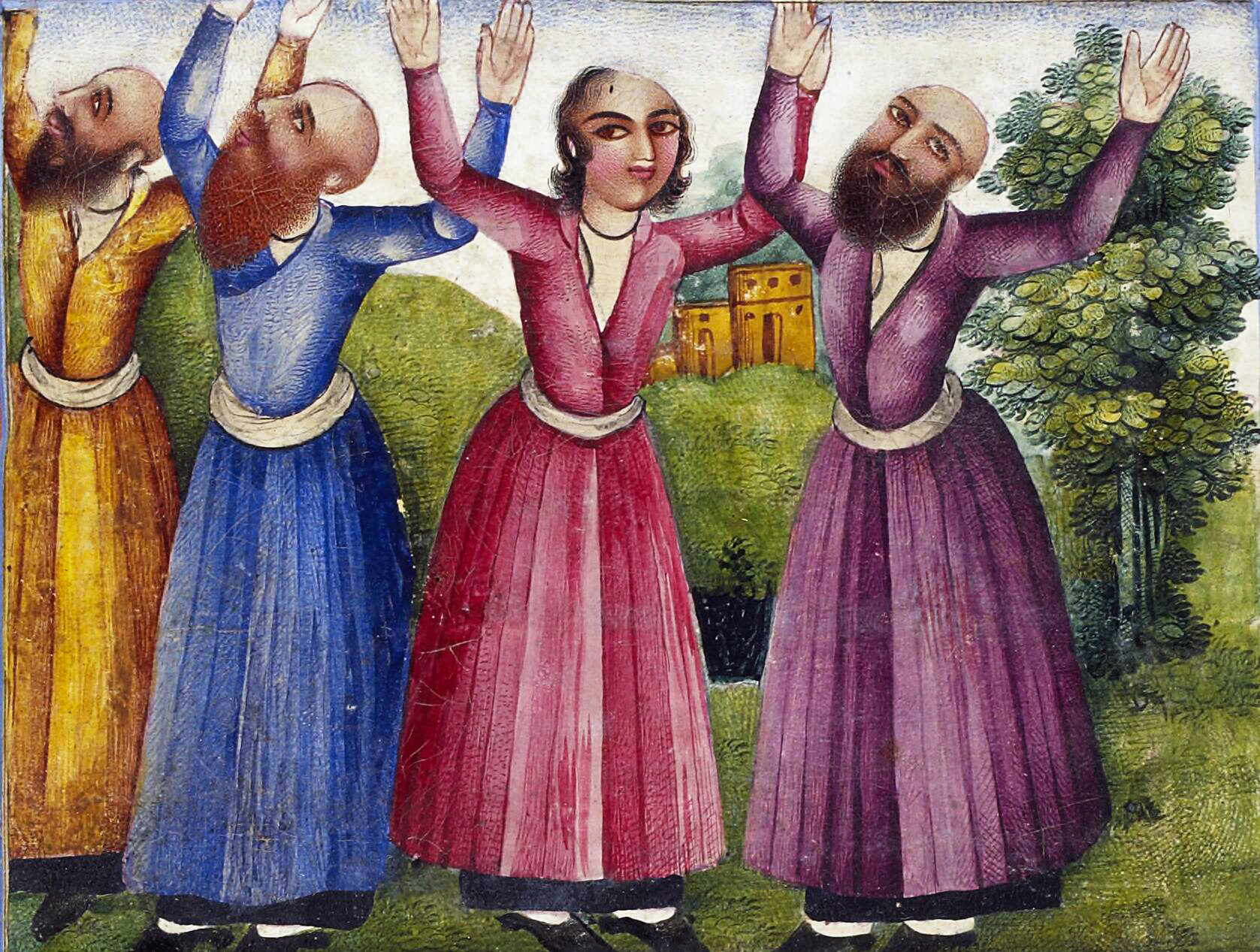
Islamic miniature depicting men and women having shaved their heads to mourn their ruler's passing.

In Sunni Islam, partial tonsure—shaving parts of the head while leaving other parts unshaven—is discouraged. This practice is referred to in Arabic as al-qazaʻ (القزع), and is explicitly mentioned in several hadith attributed to the Islamic prophet Muhammad, which emphasize consistency in hair grooming.

According to a narration recorded in Sahih al-Bukhari:

عَنِ ابْنِ عُمَرَ أَنَّ رَسُولَ اللَّهِ – صلى الله عليه وسلم – نَهَى عَنِ الْقَزَعِ
ʻAbdullah ibn ʻUmar reported: "The Messenger of Allah forbade al-qazaʻ."

Another narration expands on the reasoning:

عَنِ ابْنِ عُمَرَ رَأَى النَّبِيَّ ﷺ صَبِيًّا قَدْ حُلِقَ بَعْضُ شَعْرِ رَأْسِهِ وَتُرِكَ بَعْضُهُ فَقَالَ: احْلِقُوهُ كُلَّهُ أَوْ دَعُوهُ كُلَّهُ
ʻAbdullah ibn ʻUmar reported: "The Prophet saw a boy with part of his head shaved and some hair left. He said, 'Shave it all, or leave it all.'"

Classical Sunni jurists generally interpreted these narrations to mean that al-qazaʻ is makruh (discouraged), rather than strictly forbidden (haram). The Shafi‘i and Hanbali schools regard the practice as disliked due to the prophetic prohibition, while the Hanafi school tends to allow it unless associated with vanity or non-Islamic customs.

Some scholars also contextualize the ruling as a means of discouraging Muslims from imitating grooming styles practiced by non-Muslim religious groups, such as Christian monastic tonsure.

In contemporary times, Islamic rulings on hairstyles continue to emphasize modesty and discourage styles that reflect vanity or mimic religious or subcultural symbolism. However, many scholars note that short or stylized haircuts are not automatically included under al-qazaʻ unless they reflect the patterns explicitly prohibited in hadith.

== See also ==
- Chariton the Confessor (3rd–4th c.), compiled the "Office of the Monastic Tonsure"
- Chudakarana, Hindu tonsure ceremony
- Rule of Saint Benedict
- Shikha (hairstyle)
- Kesh (Sikhism) – opposite practice by Sikhs
