= Vidyāraṃbhaṃ =

Hindu rite of passage for young children

Vidyarambham (Sanskrit: विद्यारम्भ, romanised: Vidyārambham, lit. 'commencement of studies'), also rendered Akshara Abhyasam (Sanskrit: अक्षर अभ्यासम, romanised: Akṣara Abhyāsam, lit. 'repetition of words'), and Mutal Eluttu (Tamil: முதல் எழுத்து, romanised: Muṭal Eḻuttu, lit. 'First word') is a Hindu initiation ceremony that is performed before a child begins their formal education. This ritual is dedicated to the goddess of learning, Saraswati. It is popular in the South Indian states of Karnataka, Kerala, Tamil Nadu, Andhra Pradesh, and Telangana.

== Etymology ==
The ceremony of Vidyarambham derives its name from the Sanskrit terms Vidya meaning "knowledge", and arambham, meaning "beginning".

== Description ==
=== History ===
According to the Ancient Indian text, the Arthashastra, from the 1st or 2nd century onwards, the vidyarambham ceremony followed after the traditional hair-cutting ceremony or tonsure ceremony (caula or cuda-karana). It precedes the upanayana (initiation) ceremony, however, it came into common practice later than the upanayana ceremony. In part, this was because of the use of Sanskrit as a spoken language, which did not require preparatory education in reading and writing. Historically, the ceremony took place when the child was between the ages of 5 and 7.

=== Ceremony ===
The ceremony is intended to introduce young children into the world of knowledge, letters, and the process of learning. After a child completes four years of age, on the occasion of Vijayadashami, the father or the instructor of the child chants and writes either the Panchaksharam or the Ashtaksharam mantra on whole wheat or grains of rice, piled on a banana leaf, placed in front of a puja. Holding the hand of the child, the father or the instructor traces the words of the mantra using the former's finger. The letters of the child's native language are then written on the grain. Following the completion of this ceremony, the child is admitted for their formal education at school.

=== Significance ===
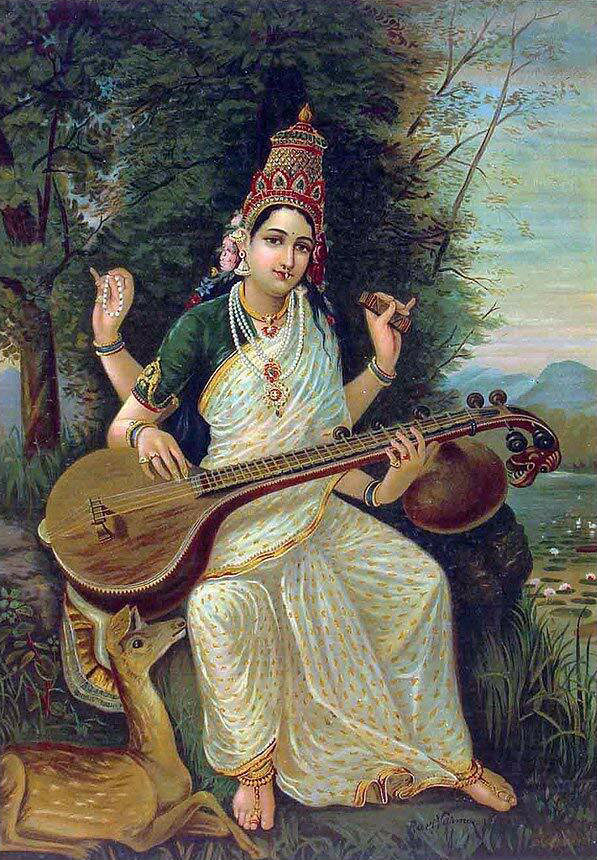
Vidyarambha is dedicated to Saraswati, the Hindu goddess of learning.

The Vijayadashami day is the tenth and final day of the Navaratri celebrations, and is considered auspicious for beginning learning in any field. The process of learning and initiation on this day is also closely related to the Ayudha Puja ritual. It is usually on Vijayadashami that the implements kept for puja are taken up again for re-use. This is also considered a day when the goddess of learning, Saraswati, and teachers (gurus) must be revered by giving gurudakshina. This usually consists of a betel leaf, areca nut, along with a small token of money and a new piece of clothing - a dhoti or sari.

=== Regional practices ===
In Kerala, this ritual is usually conducted on the last day of Navaratri, i.e. on the day of Vijayadashami, in which children are formally introduced to the learning of music, dance, languages and other folk arts. Vidyarambham can also be performed at home on an auspicious time (muhurta) following the rituals. It involves a ceremony of initiation into the characters of the syllabary. In Odisha, the festival is known as Khadi Chuan (Odia: ଖଡ଼ିଛୁଆଁ) and is mainly celebrated on Ganesh Chaturthi and Vasant Panchami. The Gnana Saraswati Temple in Basar, Telangana, is a popular temple where this ceremony is held for a large number of children.

== See also ==
- Vijayadashami
- Upanayana
- Navaratri
