= Kusti =

Kusti may refer to:

- Kosti, Sudan, major city in Sudan
- Kushti, sacred girdle worn by Zoroastrians
- Pehlwani, a South Asian form of wrestling, also known as kusti or kushti
- Kusti, male given name
  - Kusti Arhama (1885–1957), Finnish farmer and politician
