= Pultenaea daena =

Scientific classification
- Kingdom: Plantae
- Clade: Tracheophytes
- Clade: Angiosperms
- Clade: Eudicots
- Clade: Rosids
- Order: Fabales
- Family: Fabaceae
- Subfamily: Faboideae
- Genus: Pultenaea
- Species: P. daena

Binomial name
- Pultenaea daena Orthia & Chappill

Species of flowering plant

Pultenaea daena is a species of flowering plant in the family Fabaceae and is endemic to an area near Ravensthorpe in the south-west of Western Australia. It is a dense, prostrate, domed shrub with flat, hairy leaves and yellow flowers.

== Description ==
Pultenaea daena is a dense, prostrate, domed shrub that typically grows to a height of up to 7 cm (2.8 in) high and has glabrous stems. The leaves are hairy, 2–4 mm (0.079–0.157 in) long and 1.0–1.7 mm (0.039–0.067 in) wide with stipules 1.2 mm (0.047 in) long at the base. The flowers are arranged singly in leaf axils on a hairy pedicel about 3 mm (0.12 in) long, the sepals 4.2–4.5 mm (0.17–0.18 in) with hairy bracteoles 2.5–3 mm (0.098–0.118 in) long at the base of the sepals. The standard petal is yellow, 6–6.5 mm (0.24–0.26 in) long, the wings are 5–7.5 mm (0.20–0.30 in) long and the keel 5.5–7 mm (0.22–0.28 in) long. Flowering occurs in March and the fruit is a pod.

== Taxonomy and naming ==
Pultenaea daena was first formally described in 2005 by L.A. Orthia and Jennifer Anne Chappill in Australian Systematic Botany from specimens collected west of Ravensthorpe in 1997. The specific epithet (daena) is the name of the Zoroastrian goddess Daena, owing to the colour of the flowers and its half-buried habit.

== Distribution ==
This pultenaea grows on plains, near salt lakes and in disturbed areas near Ravensthorpe in the Coolgardie and Mallee biogeographic regions of south-western Western Australia.

== Conservation status ==
Pultenaea daena is classified as "Priority Three" by the Government of Western Australia Department of Parks and Wildlife, meaning that it is poorly known and known from only a few locations but is not under imminent threat.
