= Shikha (hairstyle) =

Tuft of hair worn by Hindu men

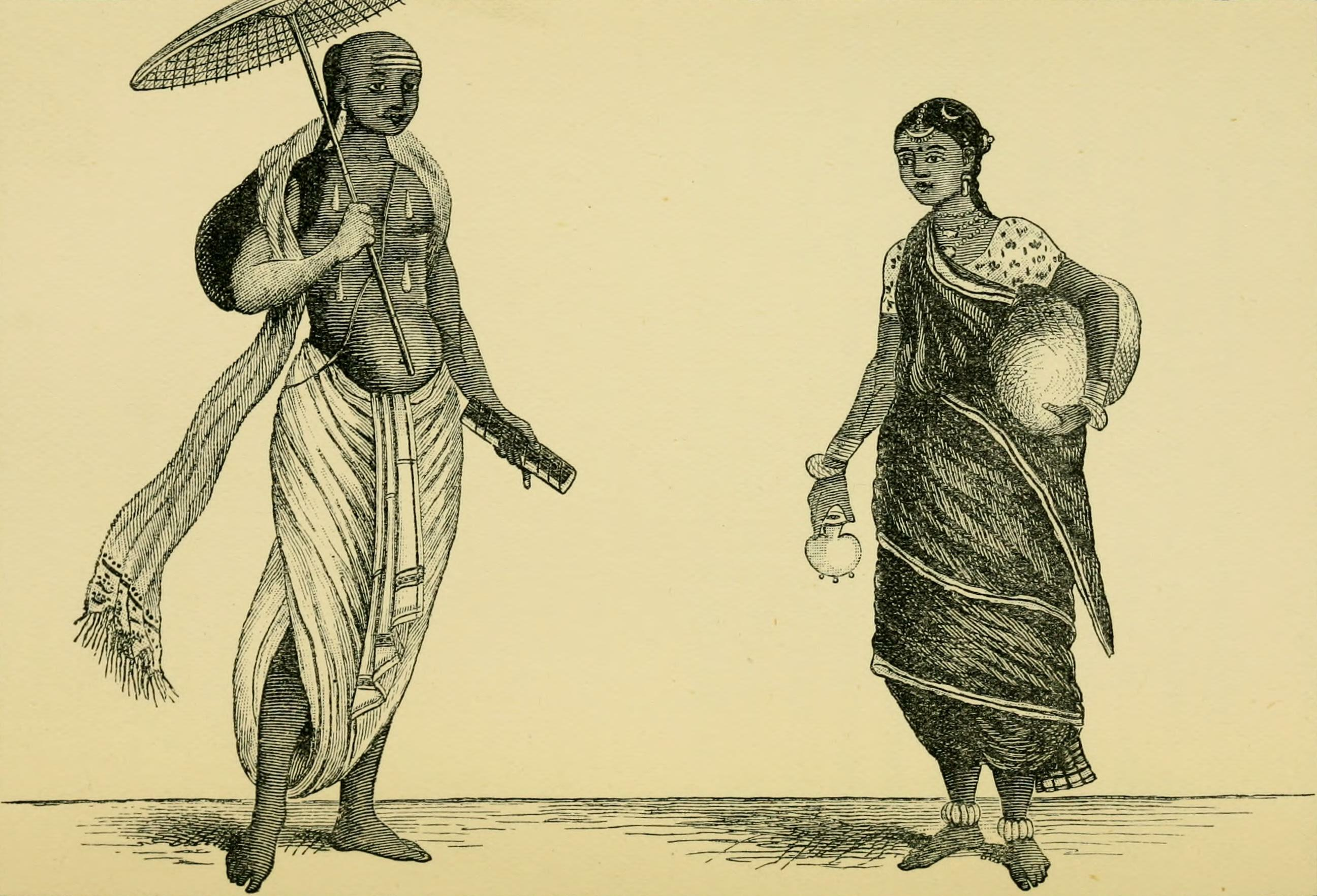
Hindu male (left) wearing his hair in a shikha

A shikha (Sanskrit: शिखा, romanized: śikhā) is a tuft of hair kept at the back of the head by a Hindu following tonsure. Though traditionally considered to be an essential mark of a Hindu, today it is primarily worn among Brahmins, temple priests, and ascetics.

== Nomenclature ==
Śikhā literally means "crest" or "tuft" in Sanskrit. The hairstyle is called kuḍumi (குடுமி) in Tamil, janḍike/śikhe (ಜಂಡಿಕೆ/ಶಿಖೆ) in Kannada, choṭi (चोटी) in Hindi and Rajasthani, ṭiki (টিকি) in Bengali, ṭīk (টীক) in Maithili, churki (चुरकी) in Bhojpuri, kuḍumi (കുടുമി) in Malayalam, choṭli (ચોટલી) in Gujarati, chôĩ (ଚଇଁ) in Odia, shẽḍi (शेंडी) in Marathi, pilaka (పిలక) in Telugu and ṭuppi (टुप्पी) in Nepali.

== Description ==
The shikha signifies a one-pointed (ekanta) focus on a spiritual goal, and devotion to God. It is also an indication of cleanliness, as well as personal sacrifice to God. According to Smriti texts, it is mandatory for all Hindus to wear a shikha, especially for the twice-born (initiated by the sacred thread called the yajnopavita). A man not keeping a tuft is regarded not to gain the full merit of religious ceremonies. Atonement is prescribed for removing the tuft with the performance of a penance called the taptakṛcchra vrata.

It is prescribed to be worn at the centre of the head because this is believed to be the region of the body that the deity Brahma is regarded to spiritually reside and a fountain of light is said to originate. According to the school of Tantra, the shikha is said to represent the orifice the human spirit enters the body during birth and leaves after death, and hence is also considered to be the focal point of the spirit. A devotee who wears the tuft is considered to be able to face any event in life with composure in this tradition. The Manusmriti prescribes wearing the tuft when bathing, offering alms, offering oblations to the fire, and during prayer.

The shikha is regarded to have gained prominence during the composition of the Sutra texts. The Katyayana Grhya Sutra states that on the occasion of a sacrifice, all hair and beard with the exception of the shikha is to be shaved. The Gobhila Grhya Sutra states that the shikha of a boy is to be arranged in accordance with the customs of his family.

== Procedure ==
Traditionally, Hindu men shave off all their hair as a child in a samskāra or ritual known as the chudakarana. A lock of hair is left at the crown (sahasrara). Unlike most other eastern cultures where a coming-of-age ceremony removed childhood locks of hair similar to the shikha, in India, this prepubescent hairstyle is left to grow throughout the man's life, though usually only the most religious men will continue this hairstyle.

The arrangement of the tuft is offered various descriptions, differing among scholars and communities. The Yajnavalkya Smriti, for example, prescribes maintaining a tuft according to one's gotra (clan):

The persons belonging to Vasishtha Gotra should keep the tuft towards the right part of the hair; those of Atri and Kashyapa, on both sides; of Bhrigu, shaven; of Angiras, five-tufts, for the sake of auspiciousness; others according to the custom of their family.

The same text also quotes the Grhya Sutras:

Having combed the hair in silence, he arranges the locks which are left over, according to the fashion of his ancestral Rishi or according to what family he belongs.

== In popular culture ==
In his autobiography, Mohandas K. Gandhi writes about his encounter with an Swami Shraddhanand:

He was pained to miss the shikha (tuft of hair) on my head and the sacred thread about my neck and said: 'It pains me to see you, a believing Hindu, going without a sacred thread and the shikha. These are the two external symbols of Hinduism and every Hindu ought to wear them.' ... [T]he shikha was considered obligatory by elders. On the eve of my going to England, however, I got rid of the shikha, lest when I was bareheaded it should expose me to ridicule and make me look, as I then thought, a barbarian in the eyes of the Englishmen. In fact this cowardly feeling carried me so far that in South Africa I got my cousin Chhaganlal Gandhi, who was religiously wearing the shikha, to do away with it. I feared that it might come in the way of his public work and so, even at the risk of paining him, I made him get rid of it.

— The Story of My Experiments with Truth, Part V

Chanakya is regarded to have undone his shikha after being insulted by King Dhana Nanda of the Nanda dynasty, vowing to leave it undone until he achieved the destruction of the dynasty.

== Gallery ==
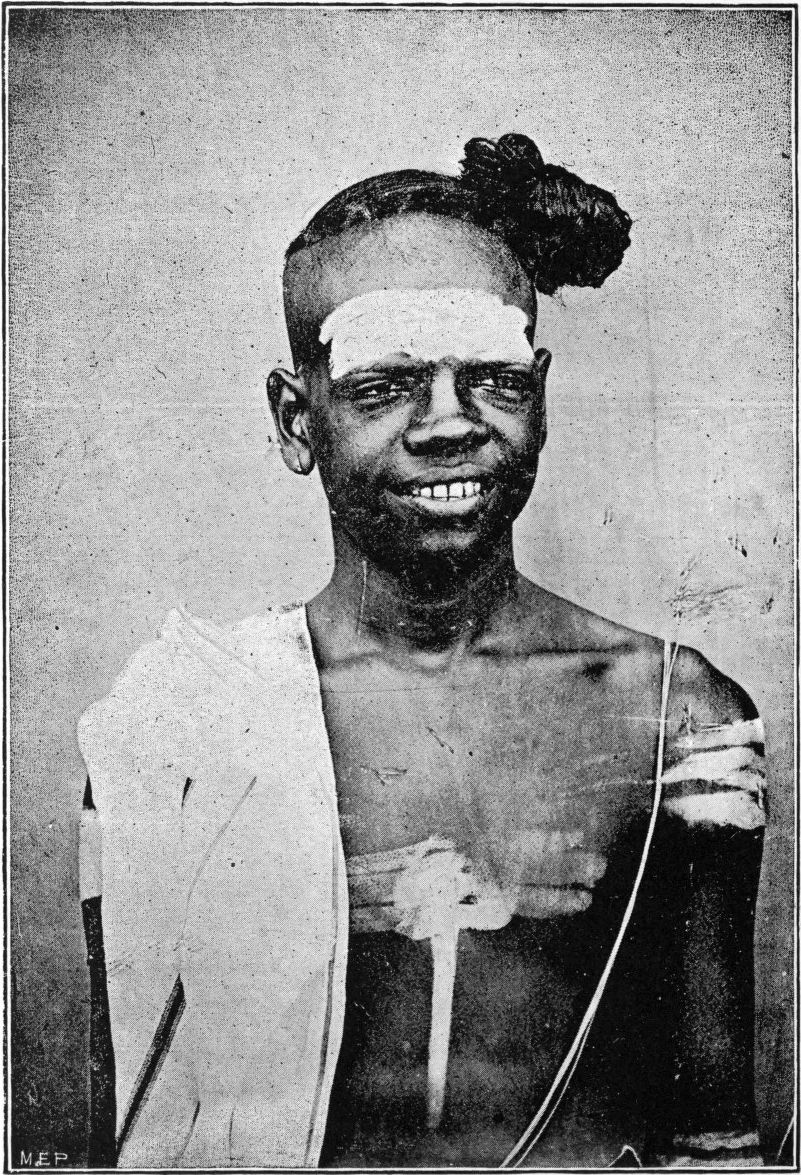
A Dikshitar from Chidambaram sporting a shikha

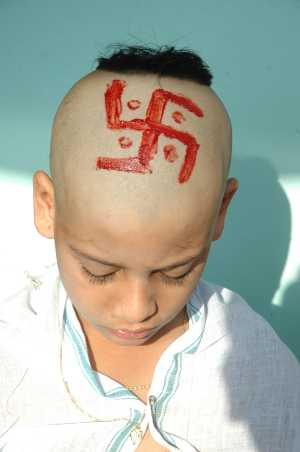
A Hindu child with a shikha and a red swastika painted on his head

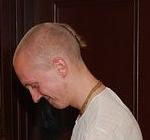
An ISKCON devotee with a shikha

== See also ==
- Chonmage
- Khokhol
- List of hairstyles
- Queue (hairstyle)
- Suebian knot
