= Dvija =

Twice-born status of Hindu male after Upanayana

Dvija (Sanskrit: द्विज) means "twice-born". The concept is premised on the belief that a person is first born physically and at a later date is born for a second time spiritually, usually when he undergoes the rite of passage that initiates him into a school for Vedic studies. The term also refers to members of the three varnas in the traditional Hindu social system, or social classes — the Brahmins (priests and teachers), Kshatriyas (rulers and warriors ), and Vaishyas (farmers, herders and merchants) — whose samskara of the Upanayana initiation was regarded as a second or spiritual birth.

The word Dvija is neither found in any Vedas and Upanishads, nor is it found in any Vedanga literature such as the Shrauta-sutras or Grihya-sutras. The word scarcely appears in Dharmasutras literature. Increasing mentions of it appear in Dharmasastras text of mid to late 1st-millennium CE texts. The presence of the word Dvija is a marker that the text is likely a medieval era Indian text.

== The meaning of the two births ==
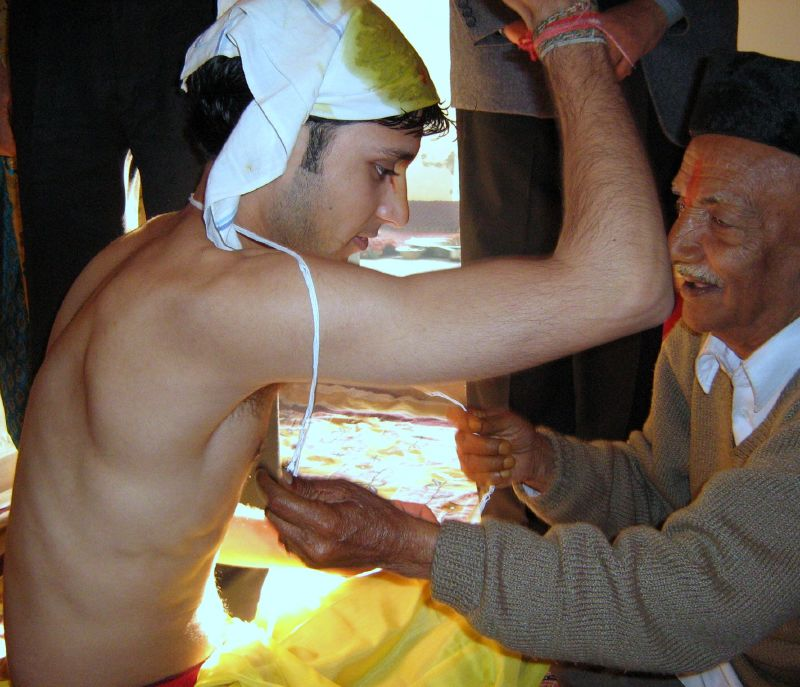
The Upanayanam thread ceremony marking initiation as a Dvija.

"Dvija" means "twice-born": the first birth is physical, while the second birth is a 'spiritual' one. The second 'birth' occurs when one takes up fulfilling a role in society, at the time of Upanayana initiation ceremony. For example, a Brahmin is initiated into school to study and pursue Brahmopadesha (preach, counsel) in the matter of the nature of Brahman, the ultimate reality. Traditionally, a Kshatriya would start learning the use of arms, while a Vaishya would start a trade apprenticeship.

The premise of the Dvija concept was that a person is born physically through his parents at home, spiritually through his teacher at school (gurukul) who helps the student form the mind and realize the self.

== Literature ==
The word Dvija, and its equivalent such as Dvijati, is neither found in any Vedas, any Upanishad, nor in any Vedanga literature such as the Vyakarana, Shiksha, Nirukta, Chandas, Shrauta-sutras or Grihya-sutras. Words such as Dvijanman appear in chapter 1.60 of Rigveda, but the context is not human beings, but "fire" once born in the heaven and then brought and born again on the earth.

The term is missing in all theological and rituals-related text preceding the 2nd-century BCE, as well as the earliest Dharmasutras texts. It makes the first appearance in Gautama Dharmasutra but not in the context later understood.

The first significant appearance of the word Dvija occurs in the Manu Smriti (166 mentions) composed between 2nd to 3rd century CE. The Yajnavalkya Smriti, composed in 4th or 5th-century CE mentions the word less often (40 times). The massive Hindu epics, the Valmiki Ramayana and the Mahabharata mention the word Dvija 214 and 1535 times respectively. (Note: The Mahabharata has about 1.8 million words. The word Dvija appears at an average frequency of once every 1170 words.) This, states Patrick Olivelle, suggest that Dvija is not a Vedic or ancient tradition of Hinduism, but an innovation that appeared sometime in the 1st millennium CE. This word is a significant scholarly marker to identify a text as likely from medieval India.

== Implications ==
Dvija, in medieval Indian texts, refers to a member of the first three varnas – Brahmins, Kshatriyas, and Vaishyas. The Asvalayana sutra indicates that a non-dvija child may also be inducted into the Dvija category, if he wishes to pursue the duties associated with these varnas.

The initiation ceremony (upanayana) invests the male initiates with a sacred thread, a loop worn next to the skin over the left shoulder and across the right hip. This Dvija-ceremony was recommended in medieval era texts for the Brahmins (priests and teachers), Kshatriyas (warriors), and Vaishyas (farmers & merchants) before they began their schools. In contrast, the Shudras were considered ineligible for Dvija-ceremony and formal schooling in these texts.

Some Sanskrit texts present a different view. The Mahabharata, for example, states that a Shudra who is self-restrained and pure conduct is like a Dvija, and suggests that Shudras can possess Vedic knowledge. Since the 19th century, the concept of Dvija has been increasingly questioned. Women have become students of Sanskrit and Vedic subjects, notably in India’s public institutions of higher learning, have chanted Vedic verses, and have even offered their services as specialists in Brahmanical rituals.

The Hindu texts offer a conflicting view of whether access to guru and education was limited to men and to certain varna (social classes or castes). The Vedas and the Upanishads never mention any restrictions based either on gender or on varna. The Upanishads assert that one's birth does not determine one's eligibility for spiritual knowledge, only one's effort and sincerity matters. Some Dharmasutras and Dharmasastras, such as Paraskara Grhyasutra, Gautama Smriti and Yajnavalkya Smriti, state all four varnas are eligible to all fields of knowledge; while verses of Manusmriti state that Vedic study is available only to men of three varnas, unavailable to Shudra and women.

The Brahmanical centres of learning were open to all the Dvija castes, states Romila Thapar, and they "appear to have attracted mainly the Brahmin students". The Dvija restrictions may be theoretical, because most students learnt their economically useful skills through apprenticeship within their family or at guilds. Other scholars also treat the Dvija concept as theory, because in reality ancient and medieval India had artisan schools where all social classes including Shudras learnt skills, and these artisans and workers built sophisticated artwork, products and large temples.

In practice, state Stella Kramrisch and others, the guru tradition and availability of education extended to all segments of ancient and medieval society. Lise McKean states the guru concept has been prevalent over the range of class and caste backgrounds, and the disciples a guru attracts come from both genders and a range of classes and castes. During the bhakti movement of Hinduism, which started in about mid 1st millennium CE, the gurus included women and members of all varna.

== See also ==
- Baptism
- Fraternity
- Freemasonry
- Religious initiation rites
