= Upanayana =

Hindu rite of passage

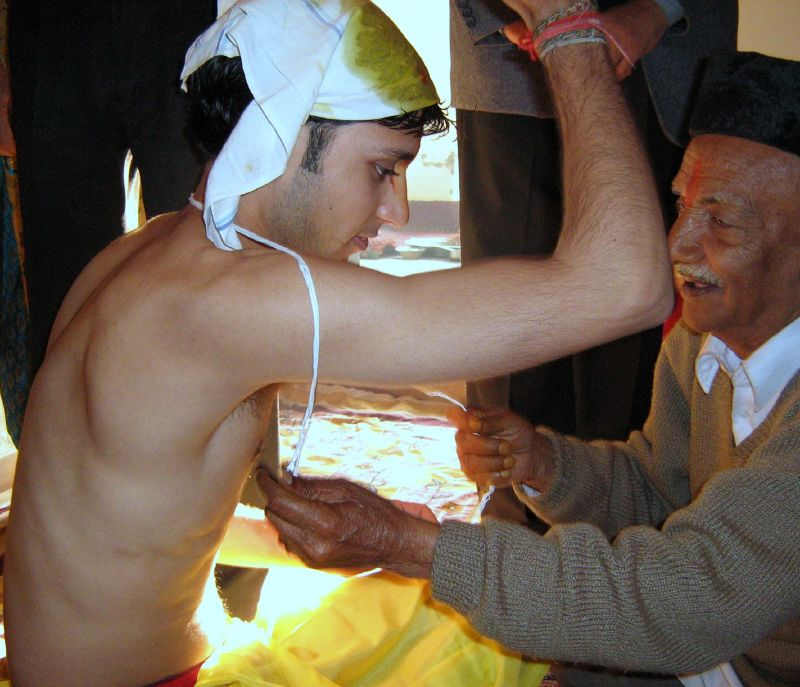
The Upanayana ceremony in progress in Nepal. Traditionally, this ritual was for 7, 9, and 11 year olds in South Asia, but is now practiced for all ages as seen above.

Upanayana (Sanskrit: उपनयन, romanized: upanayana, lit. 'initiation' (Note: According to the given community and its regional language, it is also known by numerous terms such as mekhal in Kashmiri (मेखल), janeo in Punjabi (ਜਨੇਓ), upnen/upvit in Rajasthani (उपनेन/उपवीत), jānoi in Gujrati (જાનોઇ), janya in Sindhi (जन्य), janev in Bhojpuri (जनेव), munja in Marathi (मुंजा), munji in Konkani (मुंजी), poite in Bangla (পৈতৈ), brataghara in Odia (ବ୍ରତଘର), logun dioni in Assamese (লগুণ দিওনী), bratabandha in Nepali (ब्रतबन्ध), chewar in Newari (छेवार), upanayana in Kannada (ಉಪನಯನ), upanayanamu in Telugu (ఉపనయనము), upanayanam in Malayalam (ഉപനയനം), and upanayanam or pūṇūl in Tamil (உபநயனம் or பூணூல்).)) is a Hindu educational sacrament, one of the traditional saṃskāras or rites of passage that marked the acceptance of a student by a preceptor, such as a guru or acharya, and an individual's initiation into a school in Hinduism. Some traditions consider the ceremony as a spiritual rebirth for the child or future dvija, twice born. It signifies the acquisition of the knowledge of and the start of a new and disciplined life as a brahmāchārya. The Upanayanam ceremony is arguably the most important rite for Brāhmaṇa, Kṣatriya, and Vaiśya males, ensuring their rights with responsibilities and signifying their advent into adulthood.

The tradition is widely discussed in ancient Samskṛta texts of Hinduism and varies regionally. The sacred thread or yajñopavīta (also referred to as Janeu, Jandhyam, Pūṇūl, Muñja, and Janivara Yonya) has become one of the most important identifiers of the Upanayana ceremony in contemporary times, however this was not always the case. Typically, this ceremony should be performed before the advent of adulthood.

== Etymology ==
According to the given community and its regional language, it is also known by numerous terms such as:

- upanayanam in Saṃskṛtam (उपनयनम्)
- mekhal in Kashmiri (मेखल/میکھَل)
- janeo in Punjabi (ਜਨੇਓ)
- upnen/upvit in Rajasthani (उपनेन/उपवीत)
- jānoi in Gujarati (જાનોઇ)
- janya in Sindhi (जन्य)
- janev in Bhojpuri (जनेव)
- upnæn in Maithili (উপনৈন)
- munja in Marathi (मुंज)
- munji in Konkani (मुंजी)
- poite in Bangla (পৈতে)
- brataghara/baṛughara in Odia (ବ୍ରତଘର/ବଡ଼ୁଘର)
- logun dioni in Assamese (লগুণ দিওনী)
- bratabandha in Nepali (ब्रतबन्ध)
- chhewar in Newari (छेवार)
- upanayana in Kannada (ಉಪನಯನ)
- upanayanamu/odugu in Telugu (ఉపనయనము/ఒడుగు)
- upanayanam in Malayalam (ഉപനയനം)
- upanayanam or pūṇūl in Tamil (உபநயனம் or பூணூல்).

=== Upanayana ===
Upanayana literally means "the act of leading to or near, bringing", "introduction (into any science)" or "initiation" (as elucidated by Monier-Williams). Upanayana is formed from the root √nī meaning 'to lead'. Nayana is a noun formed from the root √nī meaning 'leading to'. The prefix upa means 'near'. With the prefix the full literal meaning becomes 'leading near (to)'. The initiation or rite of passage ceremony in which the sacred thread is given symbolizes the child drawn towards a school, towards education, by the guru or teacher. The student was being taken to the Gods and a disciplined life. As explained by PV Kane, taking (the child) near the acarya (for instruction), or alternately "introducing to studenthood". It is a ceremony in which a teacher accepts and draws a child towards knowledge and initiates the second birth that is of the young mind and spirit.

=== Variations ===
A popular variation is Mauñjibandhana, derived from two words muñja, a type of grass, and bandhana which means to tie or bind. The munja grass is tied around the waist. This word was used by Manu. Another variation is vratabandha(na) meaning "binding to an observance". The word janeu is a condensed version of yagyopaveeta. The ceremony is also known as punal kalyanam (meaning auspicious thread ceremony) and Brahmopadeśa.

=== Yajnopavita ===
The sacred thread or upper garment is called the yajñopavīta (Sanskrit: यज्ञोपवीतम्, romanized: yajñopavītam), used as an adjective, which is derived from the terms yajña (sacrifice) and upavīta (worn). The literal meaning would then become "something worn on the body for the sacrifice". Accoutrements offered along with the yajnopavita may include be a daṇḍa (staff) and a mekhala (girdle).

== Description ==
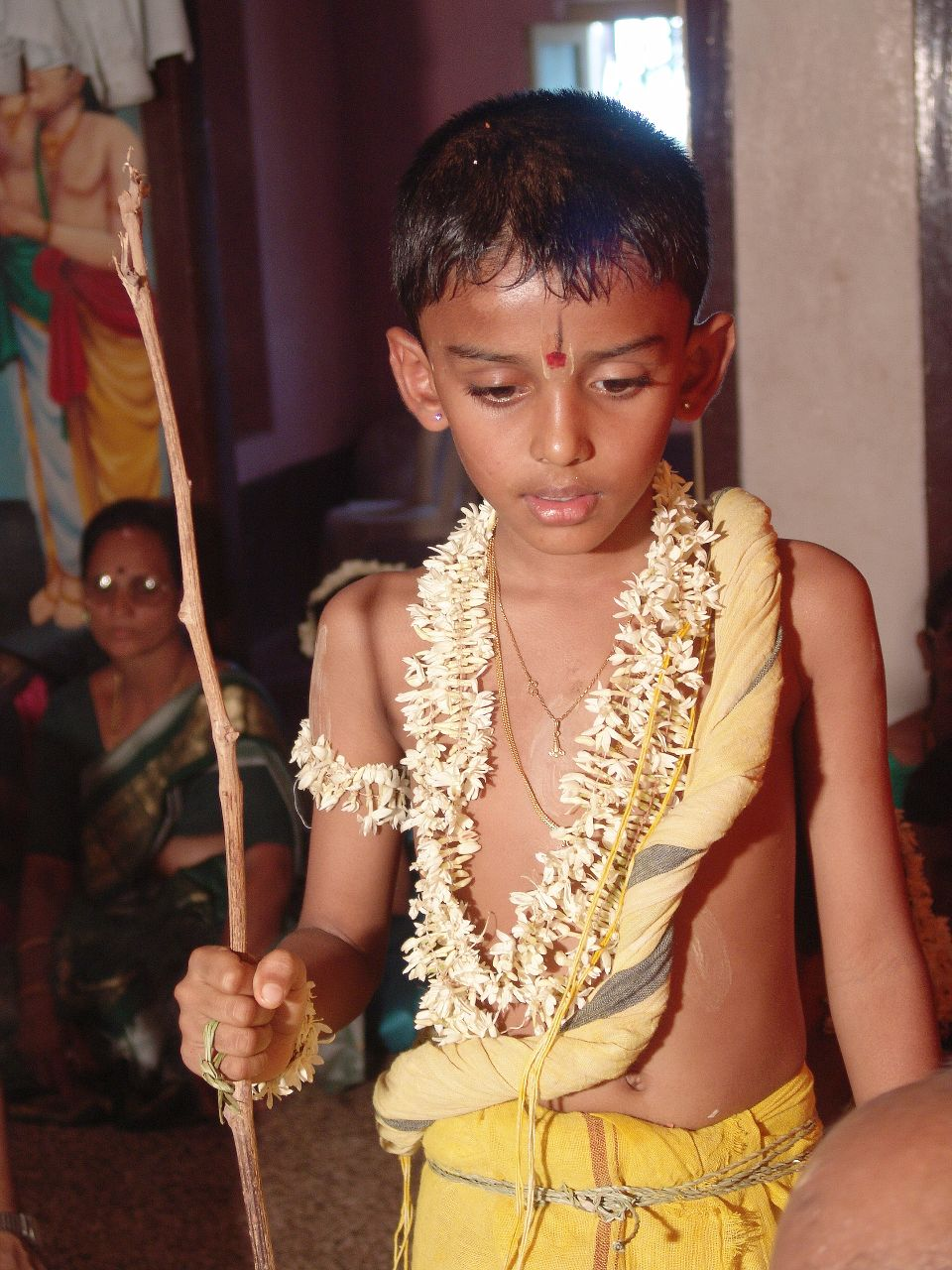
A boy from South India during his upanayana ritual. The thin, yellow yajnopavita thread runs from left shoulder to waist. Note the muñja grass girdle around the waist. The peepal tree twig in his right hand marks his entry into the Brahmacharya stage of life.

=== Background ===
The earliest form of this saṁskāra, of whose names there are no record, may have been to mark the acceptance of a person into a particular community. Indologically, the ritual is present in the Gṛhyasūtras and Dharmasūtras and Dharmaśāstras, as well as a couple of times in the Saṃhitās.

Educational courses or training has been referred to in the Chandogya Upaniṣad (Note: The story of Uddālaka Āruṇi and Śvetaketu) and in the Yājñavalkya Smṛti; Gharpure writes that during the Smṛti period, Upanayana may have attained a permanent fixture if the life of students to be as compared to being optional before.

In the Atharvaveda, and later in the Sutras period, the word upanayana meant taking responsibility of a student, the beginning of an education, a student's initiation into "studentship" and the acceptance of the student by the teacher. Preceptors could include a guru, ācharya, upādhyāya, and ṛtvik.

Gradually, new layers of meaning emerged, such as the inclusion of goddess Sarasvatī or Sāvitrī, with the teacher becoming the enabler of the connection between this goddess and the student. The meaning was extended to include Vedāngas and vows among other things. (Note: Rajbali Pandey compares the Upanayana rite of passage to Baptism, the Christian rite of admission and adoption where the person is born again unto spiritual knowledge, as Upanayana marked the initiation of the student for spiritual studies such as the Vedas. Devdutt Pattanaik would not compare the two.)

The education of a student was not limited to ritual and philosophical speculations found in the Vedas and the Upaniṣads. It extended to many arts and crafts, which had their own, similar rites of passages. The Aitareya Brāhmaṇa, Āgamas, and Purāṇas genres of literature in Hinduism describe these as Śilpa Śāstras. They extend to all practical aspects of culture, such as the sculptor, the potter, the perfumer, the wheelwright, the painter, the weaver, the architect, the dancer, and the musician. (Note: Ancient Indian texts assert that the number of the arts is unlimited, but each deploy elements of 64 kalā (कला, techniques) and 32 vidyā (विद्या, fields of knowledge)) The training of these began from childhood and included studies about dharma, culture, reading, writing, mathematics, geometry, colours, tools, as well as traditions and trade secrets. The rites of passage during apprentice education varied in the respective guilds. Suśruta and Charaka developed the initiation ceremony for students of Āyurveda. The Upanayana rite of passage was also important to the teacher, as the student would therefrom begin to live in the gurukula (school).

Upanayana became an elaborate ceremony, that includes rituals involving the family, the child and the teacher. A boy receives during this ceremony a sacred thread called the yajnopavita to be worn. The yajnopavita ceremony announces that the child had entered into formal education. In the modern era, the Upanayana rite of passage is open to anyone at any age. The Upanayana follows the Vidyārambhaṃ, the previous rite of passage. Vidyārambhaṃ became an intermediary samskāra following the evolution in writing and language. Vidyārambhaṃ now marked the beginning of primary education or literacy while Upanayana went on to refer to spiritual education. The Upanayana can also take place at the student's home for those who are home-schooled. Ceremonial bhikṣa as one of the rituals during Upanayana became important, attaining sizeable proportions. The actual initiation occurred during the recitation of the Gāyatrī Mantra. The spiritual birth would take place four days after the initial Upanayana rituals. It was then that the last ritual was performed, the Medhajanana. The Samavartanam or convocation ritual marked the end of the course. The Upanayana became a permanent feature around the Upaniṣad period.

Attire includes a daṇḍa or staff and a mekhala or girdle.

=== Age and varna ===
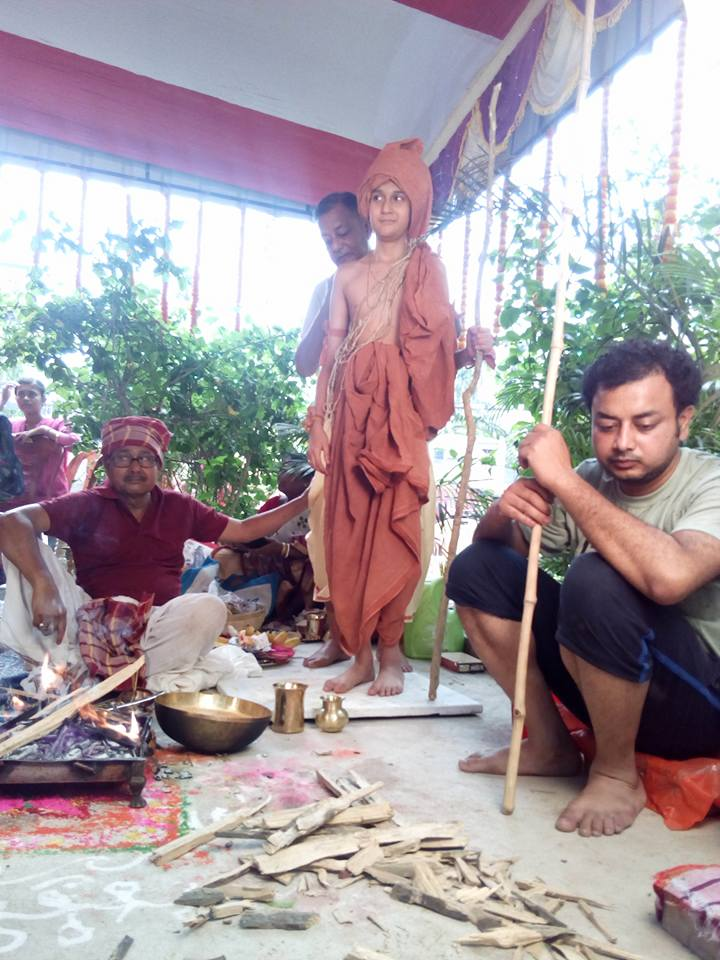
Upanayana Samskara in progress in West Bengal, India.

In Hindu traditions, a human being is born at least twice—once at physical birth and second at intellectual birth through teacher's care. The first is marked through the Jatakarman rite of passage; the second is marked through Upanayanam or Vidyārambha rites of passage. A sacred thread was given by the teacher during the initiation to school ceremony and was a symbolic reminder to the student of his purpose at school as well as a social marker of the student as someone who was born a second time (dvija, twice born).

Many medieval era texts discuss Upanayana in the context of three of the four varnas (caste, class)—Brāhmaṇas, Kṣatriyas and Vaiśyas. The ceremony was typically performed at age eight among the Brāhmaṇas, at age 11 among the Kṣatriyas, and age 12 among Vaiśyas. Apastamba Gryha Sutra (verse 1.1.1.27) places a maximum age limit of 24 for the Upanayana ceremony and start of formal education. However, Gautama Gṛyha Sūtra and other ancient texts state that there is no age restriction and anyone of any age can undertake Upanayanam when they initiate their formal studies of the Vedas.

Śūdras, or the fourth varna, do not have the rite to the Vedic Upanayana or access to Vedas as their vidhi is not mentioned in any of the Dharmashastras.

The large variation in age and changes to it over time was to accommodate for the diversity in society and between families.

Vedic period texts such as the Baudhāyana Gṛhyasūtra encouraged the three Varṇas of society to undergo the Upanayana.

Initiation to sectarian affiliation is not exclusive to ascetics, but open to householders.

=== Gender and women ===
In some texts, some girls belonging to the three varnas undergo upanayana rite of passage. In ancient and medieval eras, texts such as Harita Dharmasūtras, Aśvālayana Gṛhya Sutra and Yama Smriti suggest women could begin Vedic studies after Upanayana.

Girls belonging to the three upper varnas who decided to become a student underwent the Upanayana rite of passage, at the age of 8, and thereafter were called Brahmavadinī. They wore a thread or upper garment over their left shoulder. Those girls who chose not to go to a gurukula were called Sadyovadhu (literally, one who marries straight). However, the Sadyovadhu, too, underwent a step during the wedding rituals, where she would complete Upanayana, and thereafter wear her upper garment (saree) over her left shoulder. This interim symbolic Upanayana rite of passage for a girl, before her wedding, is described in multiple texts such as the Gobhila Gṛhya Sūtra (verse 2.1.19) and some Dharmasutras.

=== Yajnopavita ===
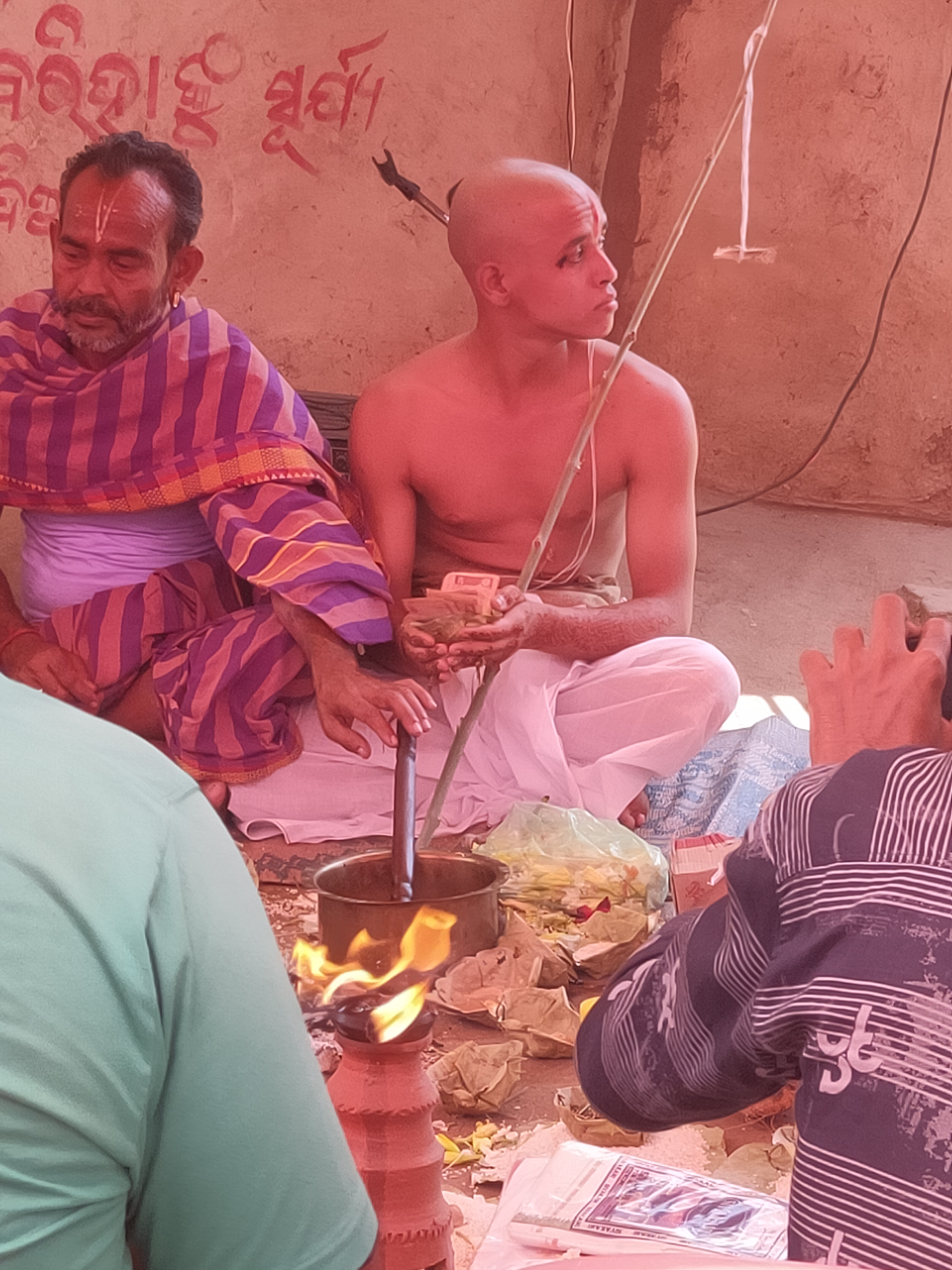
Bratopanayan in progress in an Odia household

The sacred thread or the yajnopavita has become one of the most important parts of contemporary Upanayana ceremonies. There are accordingly a number of rules related to it. The thread is composed of three cotton strands of nine strands each. The strands symbolise different things in their regions. For example, among Tamils, each strand is for each of the Tridevī, the supreme trinity of the Hindu goddesses Sarasvatī, Lakṣmī, and Pārvatī. According to another tradition, each of the nine threads represents a male deity, such as Agni, Bhaga, and Chandra.

The predecessor to the sacred thread was an upper garment (such as a dupatta or an uparane). However, as traditions developed, the upper garment began to be worn continuously. The usage of a thread grew out of convenience and manageability, becoming more popular than alternatives such as a kusa rope.

The ancient Saṁskṛta texts offer a diverse view while describing the yajñopavītam or upavita. The term upavita was originally meant to be any upper garment, as stated in Apastamba Dharmasūtra (verse 2.2.4.22–2.2.4.23) or, if the wearer does not want to wear a top, a thread would suffice. The ancient Indian scholar Haradatta (Note: Scholars place Haradatta to 1100 CE or between 1100 and 1300 CE.) states, "yajñopavītam means a particular mode of wearing the upper garment, and it is not necessary to have the yajñopavīta at all times".

There is no mention of any rule or custom, states Patrick Olivelle, that "required Brāhmaṇas to wear a sacred string at all times", in the Brāhmaṇya literature (Vedic and ancient post-Vedic). Yajñopavīta, textual evidence suggests, is a medieval and modern tradition. However, the term yajnopavita appears in ancient Hindu literature, and therein it means a way of wearing the upper garment during a ritual or rites of passage. The custom of wearing a string is a late development in Hinduism, was optional in the medieval era, and the ancient Indian texts do not mention this ritual for any class or for Upanayana.

The Gobhila Gṛhya Sutra (verse 1.2.1) similarly states in its discussion on Upanayana, that "the student understands the yajnopavita as a cord of threads, or a garment, or a rope of kusa grass", and it is its methods of wearing and the significance that matters. The proper manner of wearing the upper garment or thread, state the ancient texts, is from over the left shoulder and under the right arm. yajñopavīta contrasts with Pracinavīta method of wearing the upper garment, the latter a reverse and mirror image of former, and suggested to signify rituals for elders/ancestors (for example, funeral).

The idea of wearing the upper garment or sacred thread, and its significance, extended to women. This is reflected in the traditional wearing of sari over the left shoulder, during formal occasions and the celebration of rites of passage such as Hindu weddings. It was also the norm if a girl undertakes the Upanayana ceremony and begins her Vedic studies as a Brahmavadinī.

The sacred Yajnopavita is known by many names (varying by region and community), such as Bratabandha, Janivaara, Jaanva, Jandhyam, Poita, Pūṇūl, Janeu, Lagun, Yajnopavita, Yagyopavit, Yonya and Zunnar.

== Scholarly commentary ==
=== Doubts about Upanayanam in old texts ===
Scholars state that the details and restrictions in the Upanayana ceremony is likely to have been inserted into ancient texts in a more modern era. Hermann Oldenberg, for example, states that Upanayana—the solemn reception of the pupil by the teacher to teach him the Veda—is joined into texts of Vedic texts at places that simply do not make any contextual sense, do not match the style, and are likely to be a corruption of the ancient texts. For example, in Satapatha Brahmana, the Upanayana rite of passage text appears in the middle of a dialogue about Agnihotra; after the Upanayana verse end, sage Saukeya abruptly returns to the Agnihotra and Uddalaka. Oldenberg states that the Upanayana discussion is likely an insertion into the older text.

Kane, in his History of Dharmasastra reviews, as well as other scholars, state that there is high likelihood of interpolation, insertion and corruption in dharma sutras and dharma sastra texts on the Upanayana-related rite of passage. Patrick Olivelle notes the doubts in postmodern scholarship about the presumed reliability of Manusmṛti manuscripts. He writes, "Manusmriti was the first Indian legal text introduced to the western world through the translation of Sir William Jones in 1794". This was based on the Calcutta manuscript with the commentary of Kulluka, which has been assumed to be the reliable vulgate version, and translated repeatedly from Jones in 1794 to Doniger in 1991. The reliability of the Manusmṛti manuscript used since colonial times, states Olivelle, is "far from the truth. Indeed, one of the great surprises of my editorial work has been to discover how few of the over fifty manuscripts that I collated actually follow the vulgate in key readings."

== Regional variations ==
=== Nepal ===
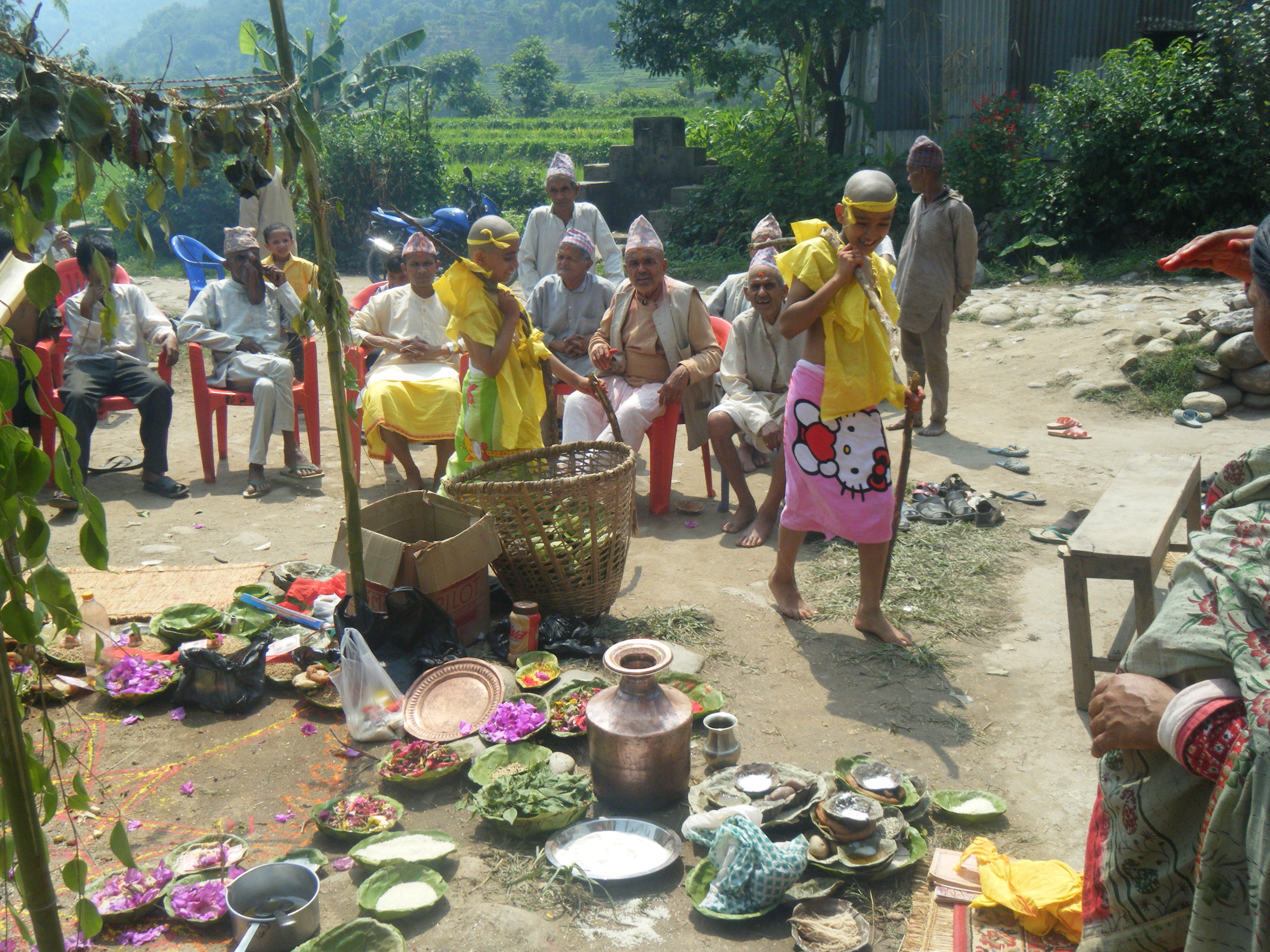
At Upanayana ceremony of Nepalis

In Nepal, a ceremony is held which combines choodakarma (tonsure, shave the head) and Upanayana saṃskāra locally known as Bratabandha (Sanskrit vrata = promise, bandhana = bond). In Nepal, The one who wears the sacred thread are called as Tagadhari.

This Sanskara involves the participation of entire family and a teacher who then accepts the boy as a disciple in the Guru–shishya tradition of Hinduism. Gayatri Mantra marks as an individual's entrance to a school of Hinduism. This ceremony ends after the boy goes for his first alms round to relatives and leave for the guru's ashram. Traditionally, these boys were sent to learn in a gurukula system of education but in modern times, this act is only done symbolically.

== See also ==
- Hinduism
  - Maithil Upanayan, the ceremonial Janeu Sanskar among Maithil Brahmins in the Mithila region
  - Kautuka or Mauli, the sacred red-saffron thread
  - Upakarma, ritual for changing the worn out Upanayana
  - Sikha, the sacred ponytail
  - Rishi, saint
  - Tagadhari, wearer of Upanayana
  - Vidyāraṃbhaṃ, a Hindu sacrament, marking a child's educational beginning
- Judaism
  - Bar and Bat Mitzvah, initiation ceremony
- Zoroastrianism
  - Navjote, Zoroastrian initiation ceremony
  - Kushti, the Zoroastrian sacred thread
- Others
  - Izze-kloth, the Apache Native American sacred cord
