= Izze-kloth =

Sacred item worn by Apache medicine men

The izze-kloth or medicine cord is a sacred cord worn by Apache medicine men that is believed to confer strength and special powers of healing to the wearer. The izze-kloth is usually made from strands of animal hide and its length is punctuated with beads and shells. Often, an izze-kloth has four strands, each dyed a different color (usually, yellow, blue, white and black).

== Etiquette ==
The izze-kloth holds great sacred symbolism and people regarded as unbelievers in the cord are almost never permitted to view, touch or discuss it. Nineteenth-century ethnological reports on Native American beliefs often commented on the difficulty in understanding the purpose and use of the izze-kloth because "the Apache look upon these cords as so sacred that strangers are not allowed to see them, much less handle them or talk about them."

== See also ==
- Apache
- Medicine man
- Yagyopavit, the Hindu sacred cord
- Kushti, the Zoroastrian sacred cord
