= Head shaving in Hinduism =

Head shaving rituals in Hinduism

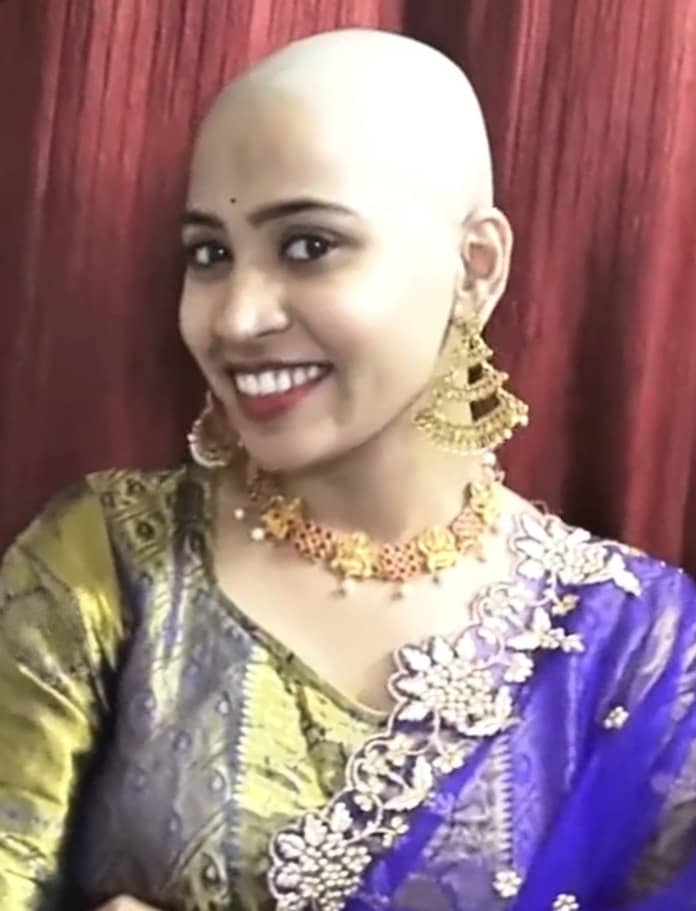
An Indian woman's head shaving as an act of Hindu religious devotion

In Hinduism, head shaving, also known as tonsuring, is a symbolic act of purification and spiritual transformation. It features prominently in various rites of passage, such as the act of shaving the baby's first hair on the head; as well as in mourning rituals, acts of penance, seeking purification, and fulfillment of wishes.

The practice signifies the shedding of ego, past impurities, and worldly attachments, aligning the individual with religious discipline and inner growth. Scriptural texts such as the Dharmaśāstra, Purāṇas, and Itihāsas mention it as a symbol of spiritual discipline and detachment. The practice varies by sect, region, and context, reflecting both personal transformation and religious duty.

== Major contexts of head shaving ==
=== Chudakarana (Muṇḍana Ceremony) ===
This is the child's first haircut, customarily performed between ages 1 to 7, often near sacred rivers like the Ganges. It serves to purify the child from past life impurities and symbolizes removal of undesirable traits, offering hair to the divine as a sign of detachment and renewal. This ceremony is considered one of the sixteen major Hindu samskaras (rites of passage).

A song sung during a child's mundan (tonsure) ceremony

=== Mourning Rituals ===
Male family members shave their heads following the death of an immediate relative as a mark of mourning, humility, and renunciation of ego. This sign of bereavement mentally prepares them for performing last rites and encourages detachment (vairagya) and positive mental focus during grief.

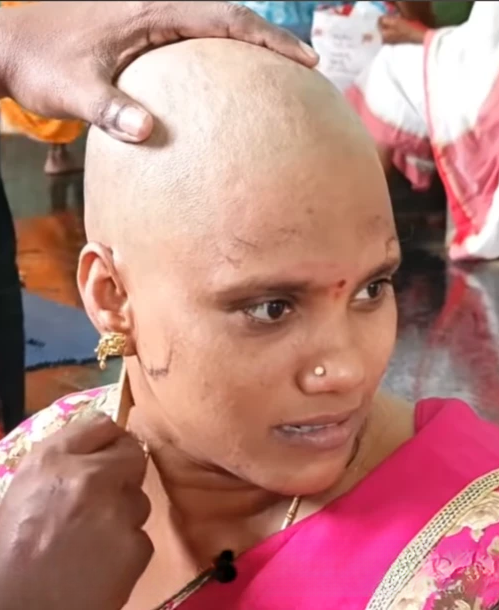
An Indian woman's head shaving

=== Penance and Fulfillment of Vows ===
Devotees shave their heads as acts of penance, gratitude, or to fulfill vows made to deities, especially during pilgrimages to sacred sites like Tirupati and Varanasi. It is seen as an offering symbolizing the surrender of pride and ego before God. This sacred ritual is often performed with deep emotion and devotion, marking a spiritual renewal. It reflects a heartfelt commitment to the divine, signifying humility, transformation, and inner purification.

Tonsure is a prominent ritual at many South Indian temples, notably at the Tirumala Venkateswara Temple, where thousands of devotees, both men and women, offer their hair in reverence. At temples like Palani Murugan and Sabarimala, tonsuring is an integral part of the pilgrimage tradition. Women, too, willingly participate in this practice as a gesture of complete surrender and thanksgiving. The act transcends social and gender boundaries, uniting devotees in a shared expression of faith.

=== Religious Initiations ===
In some Hindu sects, especially during Upanayana (sacred thread ceremony), boys partially shave their heads as a preparatory act for religious learning and commitment, symbolizing purification and readiness for spiritual education.

== Disposition of shaven hair ==
Since the 1960s, unbeknownst to most pilgrims, temples have gathered, cleaned, and sold tonsured hair to the commercial hair market. In 2019, Tirumala temple gathered and sold 157 tons of tonsured hair for $1.6 million. Tonsured hair is among the most valuable in the world for wigs and artificial hair extensions and a major export from India, which exported $770 million in 2021.

In 2004 and again in 2017, Israeli rabbis banned the use of tonsured hair for Jewish women's wigs worn to observe modesty rules, saying that the fact that it is collected as part of a non-Jewish religious ritual renders it unacceptable.

The sourcing and sale of this hair is one subject of Chris Rock's 2009 documentary Good Hair and the subject of the 2015 documentary Just Extensions.

== See also ==
- First haircut
- Sikha
