= Navjote =

Zoroastrian initiation ritual

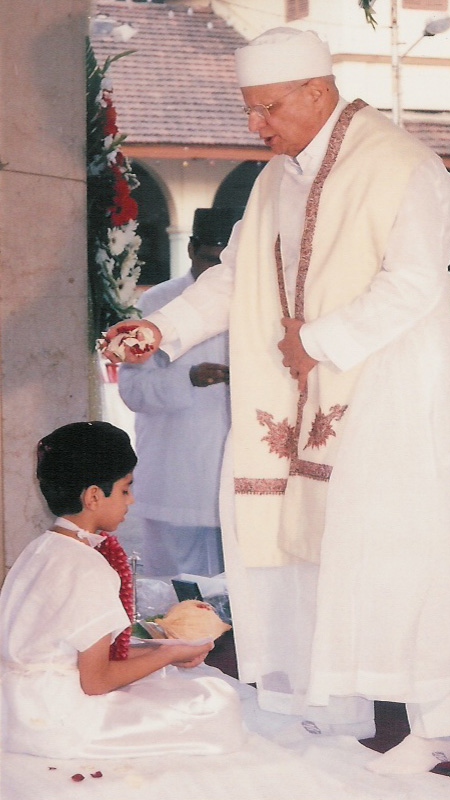
Parsi navjote ceremony

The navjote (Persian: سدره‌پوشی, sedreh-pushi) ceremony is the ritual through which an individual is inducted into the Zoroastrian religion and begins to wear the sedreh and kushti. The term navjote is used primarily by the Zoroastrians of India (the Parsis), while sedreh pushi is used primarily by the Zoroastrians of Iran.

The word 'navjote' is a Latinized form of the Parsi Gujarati compound of nav "new" and jote "reciter [of prayer]", "invoker", "sacrificer". The second half of the word is—via Zoroastrian Middle Persian zot—an indirect continuation of Avestan zaotar, with /z/ eventually becoming /j/ because /z/ is not phonemic in Gujarati. The Persian term sedreh pushi translates to "putting on the sedreh," a reference to the main component of the ritual.

== Age ==
Although there is no upper limit to the age of the individual for which the ceremony takes place, in common practice it occurs before a girl or boy reaches maturity. Under no circumstances is it permitted to be done for a child less than seven years of age since the child at that age range cannot comprehend the significance of the event. Ideally Navjote is done before the child hits puberty.

In Vendidad 18.54, individuals above the age of 15 (once considered the age at which one attained adulthood) who are not yet been invested are said to be likely to fall into evil ways. In the 9th-12th century texts of Zoroastrian tradition, the same group are said to be kushad davarashni, literally "running about improperly clothed". So for instance Menog-i Khrad 2.35 and the Book of Arda Viraf (25.6.10). The latter considers such a thing to be a service to demons (the daevas). Other texts of tradition that define adulthood as the boundary include the Sad-dar 10.1 and Shayast na-Shayast 10.13.

== Sacred kushti (thread) and sudreh (shirt) ==
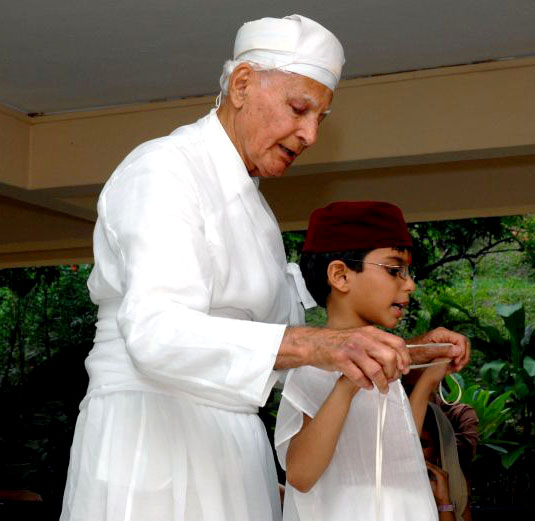
Navjote ceremony - The priest guides the child in the tying of the Kushti

The ceremony is traditionally the first time Zoroastrians wear the sedreh undershirt and kushti belt, which they then continue to wear for the rest of their lives. The sacred clothing signifies parental responsibility as well as responsibility for the one who is undergoing this ceremony. When the child wears the sacred clothes, it means the parents are now obligated to morally and religiously educate the child. If the child commits a wrongful act, it is their responsibility, as they may also take some pride in themselves when their child commits a righteous act. The sacred thread and shirt also teach children responsibility, as they are to be untied before certain practices, such as prayer, bathing, and before meals, and re-tied shortly after the task is completed.

== Preparation ==
Preparation often begins years before, as similar to a bar mitzvah in Judaism a basic knowledge of several key prayers must be shown during the ceremony.

The child must bathe in sacred water before the ceremony. This represents a cleansing and purification. A full tray of rice is also placed in the room, to be given to the officiating family priest, after the ceremony. Flowers are also placed in the room, to be given to the assembling guests after the ceremony. A tray bearing a mixture of coconut, pomegranate grains, raisins, and almonds, are in the room as well, and will be sprinkled on the child after the ceremony to symbolize prosperity.

== Ceremony ==
The ceremony is quite intricate, consisting of many recitals of faith and prayer.

Like most Zoroastrian rituals, navjote takes place in the presence of an atar, or holy fire. In the case of this ceremony, which takes place in a public place, the fire is not sanctified and following the event it is allowed to die out.

The navjote ceremony itself comprises three parts: Patet Pashemani, Din no Kalmo, and Investiture of Sedreh and Kushti, and Tan Darosti.

The Patet Pashemani is a traditional prayer of repentance and is recited by the priest on behalf of the person being initiated.

The sedreh is then slipped on to the initiate's forearms while reciting Yatha Ahu Vairo. The initiate then recites the din no kalmo (articles of faith of the Zoroastrian religion). With another Yahta Ahu Vairyo prayer the sedreh is put onto the initiate. The priest then stands behind the initiate and starts the opening stanzas from the Hormuzd Yasht. The initiate then joins in and prays the Hormazd Khodai and Jasme Avangeh Mazda prayers.

The initiate is then seated and garlanded. The priest then recites the Tan Darosti (blessings and good wishes) prayer where for the first time the appropriate prefix (behdin, osta, or osti) is used (see below) for the initiate. Persons who have not yet had a navjote are accorded the prefix Khurd.

Following the ceremony, the child is viewed as a member of the Zoroastrian community, bearing responsibility with its rewards and repercussions. An individual from a lay family is addressed in the liturgy as a behdin, "follower of the [good] religion". This may be distinguished from the title for a member of a clerical family who is henceforth addressed as an osta (for males) or an osti (for females). This does not change unless the individual actually joins the priesthood.

== See also ==
- Upanayana, Hindu thread ceremony

== Sources ==
- Peterson, Joseph H. (June 2, 2003), Zoroastrian rituals: Navjote/Sudre-Pooshi (initiation) ceremony, Minneapolis: avesta.org
- Vakil, Ratansha B. (Aug 6, 2009), Zoroastrian Priest - Dallas, Texas
