= Sedreh =

Undergarment worn by Zoroastrians

Sedreh (also called sudreh, sudre or sudra) is the Avestan term for the undergarment worn by Zoroastrians, which is worn alongside the kushti.

The sedreh contains a small pocket in the front, which does not open, which is supposed to collect one's good deeds. It is worn to protect the wearer from evil acts. It is considered a spiritual shield from evil.

== See also ==
- Temple garment, a Mormon undergarment
- Kacchera, a Sikh undergarment
