= Kushti =

Girdle worn by Zoroastrians

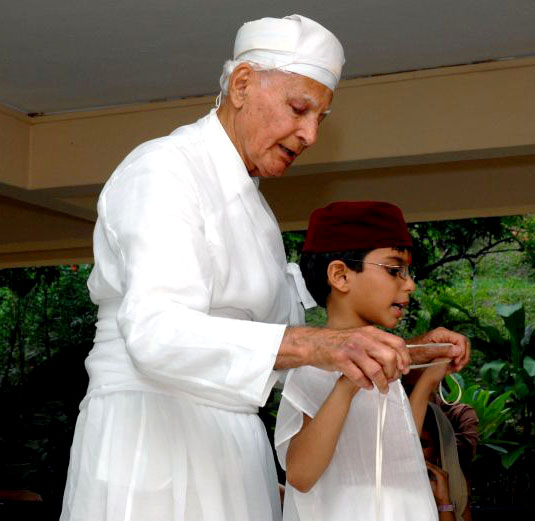
Zoroastrian priest instructing a child in the tying of the kushti in the navjote ceremony

The kushti (Note: Also kusti, koshti; formerly known as zonnar.) (/ˈkuːʃtiː/), also known as kosti, kusti and kustig, is the sacred girdle worn by invested Zoroastrians around their waists. Along with the sedreh, the kushti is part of the ritual dress of the Zoroastrians.

== Origin ==
The Avestan term for the sacred thread is aiwyaongana. Kustig is the later Middle Persian term.

The use of the kushti may have existed among the prophet Zarathushtra's earliest followers due to their prior familiarity with practices of the proto-Indo-Iranian-speaking peoples, and its Vedic analogue, the yajñopavita. Zoroastrian scripture and texts make various references to the usage of the Kusti. The Avestan Yasna (10.21) claims that a holy sage by the name of Haoma Frmi introduced it. Contrarily, the Dādestān ī dēnīg (39.18–19) claims that it was first used by the legendary Pishdadian ruler Jamshid (Yima xšaēta), centuries before Zarathustra was born. Later, Ferdowsi al-Tusi would repeat this story in the Shahnameh. Other myths claim that Zarathushtra himself recommended the practise to those who listened to his sermons (Rehbar-e Din-e Jarthushti 5).

== Description and symbolism ==
The kushti is worn wound three times around the waist. It is tied twice in a double knot in the front and back, the ends of the kushti hanging on the back. The kushti is made of 72 fine, white and woolen threads, which represent the 72 chapters of the Yasna, the primary liturgical collection of texts of the Avesta. The kushti also has 3 tassels, each with 24 threads, at each end. These 24 threads indicate the 24 chapters of the Visperad, and the sum of all tassels, which is six, represents the six gahambars (feasts).

The kushti, was often considered to be a marker of Zoroastrian identity both in India and Iran, as this passage from the Rivayats shows. In these writings, the terms Iranian and Zoroastrian are synonymous, and Zoroastrian writers did not recognise their non-Zoroastrian fellow countrymen as Iranians until the 20th century.

== Manufacture ==
In both Iran and India, the kushti is usually produced by women from priestly duties. It has a dual function of a religious duty but also a necessity to augment the modest income of Zoroastrian clergy. Occasionally kustis, were woven by priests (mobads) themselves, though this is now exceedingly uncommon. Since the 1920s, non-priestly (behdin) Zoroastrian women in Yazd province in Iran, were trained in the procedure of weaving the kushti.

Navsari, a former stronghold of Zoroastrianism became very well known for supplying kushtis to other Zoroastrians in India as well as across the diaspora. Zoroastrian students at the Tata Girls’ School at Navsari are still instructed how to weave kushtis. Traditionally Parsi women would be taught the unique skill from their elders, Najamai M. Kotwal, the mother of High Priest (Vada Dastur) Firoze M. Kotwal notably taught Parsi women for almost thirty years.

When the kusti is about 30 cm long during the weaving process, it is taken off the loom and presented to the priest to be blessed and cut. The kusti is given back to the weavers once the ceremony is over so they can finish knitting the remaining portion.

In keeping with Zoroastrian philosophy exalting happiness, the process of weaving the kushti is a joyous activity during which the women sing songs, laugh and share stories, both religious and secular.

== Rituals ==
=== Investiture ===
The navjote/sedra-pušun ceremony of initiation is traditionally the first time Zoroastrians wear the kushti. Every man and woman who has been initiated into the faith must wear a kusti, according to Zoroastrian praxis. Each boy or girl dons a white undershirt (Pahl. šabīg, Pers. šabi, ṣudra, ṣedra, Guj. sudra, sudre), and ties a kustig over it, which symbolises both the transition to adulthood and acceptance of responsibility for religious deed thereafter. The failure to wear the cord and undershirt is then considered a tanāpuhl (sin), because it leaves the wearer exposed to evil. The Šāyest nē šāyest (4.10) and the Nērangestān (67.11) equate not wearing the kushti to “scrambling around naked”. Ākā Adhyāru in the third of his sixteen slogans, considers it to be a "coat of mail armour" and writing for Hindu audience he compares the act of tying the kusti to "ablution in the [holy river] Ganges."

=== Daily rituals ===
The ritual of untying and tying the kushti is performed several times a day and is called nirang-i kushti. During this ritual, the individual must remain standing in one spot, and may not speak to anyone. If the individual speaks, the ritual must be restarted from the beginning.

Owing to its religious significance, the kushti must be worn every day of a Zoroastrian's life. The kushti must be ritually released and retied with specific prayers following the pādyāb purificatory ablution. This ceremony, known as the pādyāb-kusti, entails "making new the holy cord" (Pers. košti nav kardan) or "tying the holy cord" (Guj. kustī bastan).

The devotee should look to the east from dawn to midday and west until sunset, (toward the sun) whilst untying and tying the kushti. They can face an oil lamp, a fire, the moon, or stars at nighttime. When there is no source of light, they may face south, as it is believed to be the direction of Ahura Mazda's celestial home. Three sections make up the prayers that are recited during the ritual.

The Nīrang ī pādyāb, or "rite for ceremonial ablutions," is the name of the first section. Kə̄m nā Mazdā prayer (which has its origins in Y. 46.7, Y. 44.16, Vd. 8.21, that is recited before untying the knots. The second section is known as the Nīrang ī kustīg bastan/abzūdan, or "rite for tying the holy cord," and it is recited as the kushti is retied. Ohrmazd Xwadāy opening Pazand prayer (up to pa patit hōm) is a synopsis of the Kə̄m nā Mazdā prayer that came before it. A brief Avestan stanza that praises Ahura Mazda and scorns Angra Mainyu concludes this prayer, followed by a line taken from Y. 50.11. This section is completed by reciting one Ašǝm vohū prayer, two Yaθā ahū vairiiō (Ahuna vairiia, Ahunwar), and an additional Ašǝm vohū. The third section, which starts with the declaration Jasa mē avaŋhe Mazdā, is the Zoroastrian confession of faith (MPers. āstawānīh ī dēn); it also is titled stāyišn dēnīh “the praise of religion” in Pahlavi. The first line of this prayer is taken from the Yt. 1.27 and the remaining portion from Y. 12.8-9. It is concluded with the repetition of one Ašǝm vohū.

The padyab-kusht ceremony is required to restore the ritual effectiveness of the kusht before engaging in other religious activities like visiting a fire temple, as well as following sexual activity, urinating, and defecating. At the start of the other watches or divisions (MPers. and Pers. gh) of the day, it is released and retied each morning. Most Parsis, especially those who reside in Western nations, continue to wear the kusht on a regular basis; Iranian Zoroastrians frequently wear it just during religious ceremonies to avoid being picked out for abuse by Muslims.

=== Funeral ===
The kushti is carried in the hand at funerals to create a paywand or "ritual connection" between two people, such as corpse-bearers, who hold the kusti between them, while the Zoroastrian mourners, also in similar paywand, follow them in procession.

== Wider use ==
There is some evidence to suggest that such girdles were worn by non-Muslims in general, including Christians, as a symbol to mark them out from Muslims. An exception to this would be the Muslim Mughal Emperor Akbar the Great, who was invested with a kusti and sedreh by the Zoroastrian Parsi community of Gujarat.

The kushti (zonnar) is mentioned by Omar Khayyam, thought to have been the son of a Zoroastrian convert.

For how long must I profess ignorance
Heartsick am I of this distress
The Magi's zonnar that I shall don,
Do you know why? Of the shame in being Moslem

— Rubaiyat of Omar Khayyam

== See also ==
- Yagyopavit, the sacred thread of Vedic Hinduism
- Izze-kloth, the sacred cord of the Apache Native American tribe
- Zunnar, a medieval belt worn to distinguish non-muslims
