= Jitendriya =

Jitendriya was a Sanskrit-language writer on dharma-shastra (Hindu law and conduct), who likely lived in the Bengal region of India. Historians place him variously from 9th to 11th century. The 12th century scholar Jimutavahana cites him as an authority, but his works are now lost.

== Date and place ==
The only historical writer known to have quoted Jitendriya is the 12th-century writer Jimutavahana. According to historian P. V. Kane, the 16th-century writer Raghunandana also quotes Jitendriya, but historian Sures Chandra Banerji dismisses this, stating that the name mentioned by Raghunandana is "Jinendra", not "Jitendriya". Either way, both Jimutavahana and Raghunandana were from the Bengal region, and therefore, Jitendriya was likely a native of Bengal. Kane theorizes that Jitendriya flourished around 1000-1050 CE, while Banerji places him between the 9th and the 10th centuries, arguing that by Jimutavahana's time, his authority must have been firmly established.

== Works ==
The writings of Jitendriya are now lost. However, it is known that wrote an extensive work on dharma-shastra, as attested by Jimutavahana's writings. The Kāla-viveka of Jimutavahana quotes him on the topic of kāla, that is, determination of auspicious times for religious rites. Jimutavahana's Dāyabhāga mentions his views on inheritance law and atonement (prayashchitta); it suggests that Prayashchitta-kanda was either the title of a treatise by Jitendriya, or the title of a section of that treatise. Jimutavahana's Vyavahāra-mātraka quotes him on law court procedures.

Jimutavahana's references suggest that Jitendriya was an authoritative figure in the Bengal region. Jimutavahana's writings appear to have overshadowed Jitendriya's works, and rendered them obsolete to the later writers.
