= Bālaka =

Bālaka (fl. sometime before 1100 CE) was a Sanskrit-language writer on dharma-shastra (Hindu law and conduct), who lived in the Bengal region of India. He wrote Smriti digests (nibandha), which are cited by several later writers.

== Date and place ==
The only extant references to Bālaka come from writers from the Bengal region, which suggests that he was a resident of Bengal. A manuscript of Bhava-deva's Prayaschitta-nirupana mentions him as Vāloka, which seems to be a Bengali scribe's pronunciation of the name "Bālaka". Thus, Bhava-deva (fl. c. 1100 CE) is the earliest known writer to cite him, which suggests he flourished sometime before 1100 CE.

=== Identification as Bālarupa ===
Historian P. V. Kane theorizes, "with some hesitation", that Bālaka may have been same as Bāla-rupa, who has been mentioned in historical dharma-shastra texts, such as Harinatha's Smṛti-sāra, Misrau-mishra's Vivada-chandra, Vachaspati's Vivada-chinta-mani, and Aditya-bhatta's Kala-darsha. Harinatha, Misrau-mishra, and Vachaspati belonged to Mithila, a region neighbouring Bengal: these writers mention Bāla-rupa, but not Bālaka. Kane notes that Harinatha refers to "the author of Bāla-rupa", implying that Bāla-rupa was the name of a literary work; others however, speak of Bāla-rupa as an author.

According to Kane, the names Bālaka ("child") and Bāla-rupa ("having the appearance of a child") are "nearly the same". While refuting the views of Bālaka, Jimutavahana, in his Dāyabhāga, states that he has exposed the Bāla-rupatva ("childishness") of Bālaka. According to Kane, this can be interpreted as the evidence that Jimutavahana considered Bālaka and Bālarupa as identical. According to scholar Savita Vishnoi, this is debatable.

== Work ==
Bālaka's writings are now lost, but citations to them survive in the works of later writers, including Bhava-deva, Jimutavahana, Shula-pani and Raghu-nandana. These writers cite him on topics such as atonement (prayaschitta), legal procedure (vyavahara), inheritance (dayabhaga), and Durga Puja rites (durgotsava).

The earliest writers to cite Bālaka do not hold him in high regard. Bhava-deva (fl. c. 1100 CE) refutes his views, stating that they should be disregarded. Jimutavahana (c. 12th century) cites him in support of his own views once, but otherwise dismisses them as words of a child ("bālaka" in Sanskrit). Jimutavahana's Dāyabhāga states that Bālaka had misinterpreted a text of the ancient writer Āpastamba. The Durgotsava-viveka of Shula-pani (c. 1375-1460) quotes him twice, once to refute him. The fact that these writers take time to refute Bālaka's views instead of silently ignoring them suggests that he was considered an important writer of his time.

Unlike the earlier writers, Raghunandana (c. 16th century) cites Bālaka as a recognized authority.
