= Mithila school of Hindu law =

School of Hindu law in Mithila

- Region of ancient Mithila

Information
- Other names: Mithila school
- Type: Branch of Hindu law
- Religious affiliation: Hinduism
- Founder: Yajnavalkya
- Status: School of thought in Hindu law
- Authority: Mitakshara
- Affiliation: Hindu law

Mithila school of Hindu law, or simply the Mithila school, is a major sub-school of the Mitakshara school of Hindu law. It is one of the five major schools of Hindu law and is considered by some sources to be the oldest of the five.

The school is prevalent in the region historically known as Mithila. Its jurisdiction encompasses the Tirhut or Mithila region, North Bihar, and parts of Uttar Pradesh. In Uttar Pradesh, it is reported to have applied in areas near the Yamuna River.

The Yajnavalkya Smriti is a recognised authoritative text and serves as the foundation of the Mithila school. The writings of Srikara associated with the Mithila school are regarded as antecedents of the Benares school.

== Background ==
Vijnaneshvara, the founder of the Benaras school, referred to a Northern school and a Southern school that were prevalent in his time. The Northern school mentioned was the Mithila school represented by Shrikara, while the Southern school was the Dravida school, established by Medhatithi and his followers. Thus, it appears that the Mithila and Dravida schools predated the Banaras school established by Vijnaneshvara. The Vedic philosopher Yajnavalkya promulgated his legal codes in Mithila. Thus, it is natural to assume that the study of law was pursued there with great zeal and dedication from his time onwards, making it the center from which these legal principles spread across the Indian subcontinent.

== Authorities ==
The ancient Vedic text Yajnavalkya Smriti attributed to the revered Vedic sage Yajnavalkya in the Mithila Kingdom, is the main ancient authority in the Mithila school of thought. In the modern era, the main authority of the Mithila school is the Mitakshara text authored by Vijnaneshvara. The Mithila school of thought in the Hindu Law relies on some key commentaries such as Vivada Chintamani, Vivada Ratnakar, and Vivada Chandra. The commentary text Vivada Chintamani was authored by the Naiyayika Vachaspati Mishra. Similarly the commentary text Vivada Ratnakar was authored by the Maithil theorist Chandeshwara Thakura. And the commentary text Vivada Chandra was authored by the Maithil scholar Misaru Misra or Lakshmi Devi.
