= Mulaghatika Ketana =

Telugu language poet and writer from southern India

Mulaghatika Ketana (Telugu: మూలఘటిక కేతన, c. 1220–1260) was a Telugu language poet and writer from southern India. He was a disciple of the poet Tikkana, and wrote multiple works under Tikkana's sponsorship.

== Works ==
Ketana wrote the following works:

- Dasa-kumara-charitamu is a Telugu translation of Dandin's Dasha-kumara-charita. Ketana assumed the title Abhinava Dandi ("the New Dandi"), and dedicated his work to Tikkana.
- Vijnaneshvaramu or Vijnaneshvariyamu is a legal dharmashastra text based on Mitakshara, Vijnaneshvara's commentary on Yajnavalkya Smrti. Like the other dharmashastra texts, Ketana adheres to the varna system, treating Brahmins and men favourably. He highlights the importance of Brahmins in governance, and recommends that the rulers follow the advice of the Brahmins knowledgeable about the shastras.
- Andhra-bhasha-bhushanamu ("Ornament of the Andhra Language") is a work on grammar. This was likely the earliest Telugu grammar. Andhra-shabda-chintamani, purported to be an earlier work attributed to Nannaya, is a fictitious work, and the sutras attributed to Nannaya in this work are likely from a later period, with their final version dating to the 17th century.
