= Vijnaneshvaramu =

13th-century dharmasastha by Ketana

- Author: Ketana
- Language: Telugu
- Subject: Hindu law
- Genre: Dharma-shastra
- Publication date: 13th century
- Publication place: Kakatiya kingdom (present-day India)

Vijnaneshvaramu (IAST: Vijñāneśvaramu) is a 13th-century Telugu language dharma-shastra (Hindu law) text composed by Ketana in present-day southern India. It is based on the Sanskrit-language Mitakshara, a legal commentary on the Yajnavalkya Smriti. Ketana made changes to the Mitakshara laws to make them consistent with the contemporary Andhra society. According to scholar A. Padma, the text was "the basic source of law" during the Kakatiya rule.

== Views ==
If a woman is found with an illegitimate lover,
and tries to claim that he is a burglar,
he should still be fined five hundred
as an illegitimate lover.

— Ketana's Vijnaneshvaramu, verse 129

=== Varna and caste ===
Vijnaneshvaramu is a socially conservative text that follows the Brahmanic dharma-shastra tradition and considers the caste hierarchy as the most important aspect of a functioning society. The author considers the king as a guarantor of this hierarchy, and states that the king's council should include Brahmin advisors.

Like the Manu Dharma-shastra, Ketana's work suggests variations in trials and punishment based on the convict's varna. For example, according to the text:

- If a lower-caste man commits a crime deserving capital punishment, he should be killed. If a Brahmin commits the same crime, his money should be confiscated, he should be humiliated in various ways (e.g. being made to sit on a donkey), and he should be driven out of town, but not killed.
- If a lower-caste man rapes the wife of an upper-caste man, the rapist should be killed. If the rapist and the victim are belong to the same caste, the rapist should be fined 1000 panas (silver currency unit).
- If a lower-caste man has sex with a higher-caste virgin, he should be killed. If a higher-caste man has sex with a lower-caste virgin, he should be fined 500 panas, and if the virgin loves him, the two should be married. If a Brahmin has sex with a chandala (outcaste/untouchable) woman, he should be humiliated by inscribing the drawing of a vagina on his body, fined, and driven out of the town.

Similarly, Ketana lists different ways of determining if a person is telling the truth, depending on the person's varna. For example, a Brahmin is weighed against bricks once, and then again on the day of the test: if he is lighter, he is determined to be telling the truth. Compared to this soft treatment, a Kshatriya is tested by placing a hot iron ball in his hands: he is determined to be telling the truth, if his hands are not burnt. Similarly, a Vaishya is tested using water, and a Shudra by poison.

=== Women ===
The punishments recommended by Ketana vary by gender. For example, a high caste woman who has sex with a Shudra man is not to be killed: instead, she should undergo ritual atonement (prayashchitta); if she becomes pregnant, her husband should leave her.

According to Ketana, both husband and wife should lead a virtuous life and have children. Ketana expects women to remain chaste and religious. The text suggests that women enjoyed some degree of social justice and rights. Ketana specifies punishments for a husband who takes away the ornaments of his wife by force. He also allows women to enter into contracts, although only with the consent of their husbands. He does not allow remarriage for women.

Ketana does not consider prostitution a sin, and refers to laws aimed at protecting prostitutes from their greedy procurer mothers and their clients, as well as laws aimed at curbing the unfair earning practices of the procurers. Punishments for the greedy mothers include monetary fines in combination with other punishments such as cutting the convict's nose or ears, and shaving her head. Monetary fines are imposed on clients convicted of causing physical injuries to prostitutes.

=== Other ===
Ketana strongly defends the royal authority, and recommends severe punishments for those who challenge it. For example, if a person insults the king, Ketana mandates cutting his tongue, and driving him out of town.

Ketana outlines various rules to maintain social harmony. For example, someone who ridicules a handicapped person should be fined three rukas. Someone who abuses people based on their country (e.g. calling people from Murikinadu stupid), language (e.g. calling Aravas, that is, Tamil speakers quarrelsome) or caste (e.g. calling Brahmins greedy), should be fined a 100 panas.

According to Ketana, a man who engages in incest should have his genitals cut off. However, he states that consanguinous marriage with one's paternal aunt or maternal uncle's daughter is an acceptable custom in southern India.
