= Nirṇayāmṛta =

Sanskrit-language text by Allāḍanātha

The Nirṇayāmṛta (lit. "the nectar of decisions"), also transliterated as the Nirnayamrita, is a 14th-16th century Sanskrit-language text by Allāḍanātha on determining auspicious times for Hindu religious ceremonies. It comprises four chapters (prakaraṇas): vrata-nirṇaya, tithi-nirṇaya, śrāddha-nirṇaya, and āśauca-nirnaya.

R. G. Bhandarkar classifies Nirṇayāmṛta among the dharma-śāstra texts. David Pingree's Census of the Exact Sciences in Sanskrit records 24 manuscripts of the text which have several variations.

== Date and place ==
Sources that quote the Nirṇayāmṛta include Raghunandana (16th century), the Nirnaya-sindhu (which also quotes Raghunandana), and Bhattoji Dikshita's Tithi-nirnaya (17th century). Alladanatha names one of his sources as the Parijata: if this is same as the Madana-pārijāta (c. 1375 CE), Alladanatha must have lived sometime during the 14th-16th century.

Allāḍa-nātha was a son of Lakshmana (Lakṣmaṇa) Siddha, and wrote the book for a king named Sūryasena. Some manuscripts of the book attribute its authorship to Sūryasena, or to Gopi-narayana.

The Nirṇayāmṛta describes Alladanatha's patron Sūryasena as the king of Ekachakra and a member of the family of Chvahuvana (possibly Chahuvana, that is the Chauhans). The text provides the following genealogy of the king: Sarupa belonged to the famous race of Chahuvanas and destroyed all his enemies. His son was Karna-deva, whose son Uddharana performed military exploits at Delhi and wounded the elephants of the "Lord of the Shakas". Uddharana settled in the city of Ekachakra, located on the banks of the "daughter of the Sun" (the Yamuna River). His son Chandra-sena had two sons: Surya-sena the elder, and Pratapa-sena the younger. Surya-sena had a son named Deva-sena. No other source mentions this dynasty. The genealogy does not match with that of the Sena dynasty of Bengal. Alexander Cunningham identified Ekachakra with Arrah in present-day Bihar, but that place is not located on the banks of the Yamuna River.

According to one theory, Alladanatha was a contemporary of the Chauhans of Etawah, who were defeated by the Tomaras of Gwalior in 1390.

== Sources ==
Alladanatha states that he consulted the following sources to compose his treatise:

- Manu-smṛti
- Viṣṇu-smṛti
- Pārāśara-smṛti
- Āpastamba-smṛti
- Mitākṣarā
- Aparārka - a commentary on the "Yājñavalkya-smṛti" composed by Aparāditya II, Silahara king of North Konkan in 1170-1197 CE
- Arṇava
- Pārijāta
- Smṛtyartha-sāra
- Smṛti-chandrika
- Matsya
- Kaurma
- Varāha
- Vaisnava
- Vāmana
- Mārkaṇḍeya
- Bhaviṣyottara
- Hemadri's Pariśiṣṭa
- Ananta-bhaṭṭīya
- Gṛhya-pariśiṣṭa
- Kālādarśa-cintāmaṇi
- Tridaṇḍin
- Kṛtya-kalpataru - a "nibandha" composed by "Lakṣmīdhara", a minister of Govindacandra, Gāhaḍavāla king of Antarvedī (present-day Ganga-Yamuna doab) in 1114-1155 CE
- Dhavala-purāṇa-samuccaya
- Durgotsava
- Rāma-kautuka
- Saṃvatsara-pradīpa
- Bhoja-rājīya - a "nibandha" composed by Bhoja, Paramāra king of Malwa in 1010-1045 CE
- Deva-dāsīya
- Rūpanārāyaṇīya
- Vidya-veda-paddhatī
- Mahādevīya
- Viśvarūpa's Nibandha
