= Raghunandana =

Sanskrit scholar from Bengal

- Born: c. 16th century CE; Nabadwip
- Other names: Raghunandan Bhattacharyya, Raghunandana Bhaṭṭācāryya
- Occupation: Sanskrit writer

Raghunandana (c. 16th century CE) was an Indian Sanskrit scholar from the Bengal region. His writings include 28 Smriti digests on Hindu law and a commentary on the Hindu law code prevalent in Bengal, the Dayabhaga.

== Life ==
Raghunandana was born at Nabadwip to a Bengali Brahmin named Harihara Bhattacharya. He was a pupil of Srinatha Acharya Chudamani. His writings mention Rayamukuta (1431 CE), and are mentioned by Viramitrodaya of Mitramisra (early 17th century). Thus, it can be inferred that Raghunandana lived around the 16th century CE. Other earlier texts cited by him include the Nirṇayāmṛta and Kāla-mādhava. Tradition has it that he was a junior contemporary of Chaitanya Mahaprabhu and a batch-mate of Navya-Nyaya scholar Raghunatha Siromani.

The various estimates of his lifespan include:

- Rajendra Chandra Hazra: 1520–1570
- Monmohan Chakravarti: born 1490 or 1500, literary activity during 1520–1575
- Pandurang Vaman Kane: 1510–1580

Bani Chakravarti wrote a book on him titled the Samaj-samskarak Raghunandan (Raghunandan, Culture Giver/Enhancer) in 1964 in the Bengali language.

== Works ==
=== Astavimsati-tattva ===
Raghunandana authored 28 Smriti digests on civil law and rituals, collectively known as the Astavimsati-tattva. The English scholars compared Raghunandana's digests to the Comyns' Digest, and called him the "Comyns of India".

The titles of these digests end in the word tattva (literally "essence"). 27 of these works are mentioned at the beginning of the Malamasa-tattva.

The 28 digests include:

1. Ahnika-tattva which deals with daily rites (like bathing, sandhyavandana etc)
2. Chandoga-vrsotsarga-tattva which deals with performance of the rite of vrishotsarga (a Hindu rite in which a bull stamped with the marks of trishula is let loose in the name of a deceased person with the aim of the dead obtaining salvation) by brahmins following the Samaveda (the Veda followed by most Bengali brahmins)
3. Daya-tattva which deals with laws of inheritance & property division, based on the Dayabhaga
4. Deva-pratishtha-tattva which deals with the rite of consecrating idols for worship
5. Diksha-tattva which deals with the rites of diksha
6. Divya-tattva which deals with various trials by ordeal
7. Durgotsava-tattva which deals with the rite of Durga Puja
8. Ekadashi-tattva which deals with the rules & regulations related to ekadashi
9. Janmashtami-tattva which deals with the rite of Janmashtami
10. Jyotisha-tattva which deals with timekeeping & determining the right time for performance of rituals
11. Krtya-tattva which deals with the rites to be observed throughout the year
12. Malamasa-tattva (or Malimluca-tattva) which deals the rules & regulations related to adhika-masa
13. Matha-pratishtha-tattva which deals with the rite of consecrating temples
14. Prayashchitta-tattva which deals with various expiatory rites
15. Purushottama-kshetra-tattva which deals with special rites to be performed while on a pilgrimage to Puri & Bhubaneswar
16. Rg-vrsotsarga-tattva which deals with the performance of the rite of vrishotsarga by brahmins following the Rigveda
17. Sama-shraddha-tattva which deals with the performance of the rite of shraddha by brahmins following the Samaveda
18. Samskara-tattva which deals with the rites of passage
19. Shuddhi-tattva which deals with the rites of penitence
20. Sudra-krtya-tattva which deals with the rights & privileges of shudras
21. Taddga-bhavanotsarga-tattva which deals with the rite of consecrating waterbodies
22. Tithi-tattva which deals with rites to be performed at specific tithis
23. Vastuyaga-tattva which deals with the rite of vastuyajna
24. Vivaha-tattva (or Udvaha-tattva) which deals with rules & regulations related to marriage
25. Vrata-tattva which deals with performance of vratas
26. Vyavahara-tattva which deals with judicial procedure
27. Yajuh-shraddha-tattva which deals with the performance of the rite of shraddha by brahmins following the Shukla-Yajurveda
28. Yajur-vrsotsarga-tattva which deals with the performance of the rite of vrishotsarga by brahmins following the Shukla-Yajurved

The Chandoga-vrsotsarga-tattva, Rgvrsotsarga-tattva and Yajur-vrsotsarga-tattva are collectively known as the Vrsotsarga-tattva. The Deva-pratishtha-tattva and Matha-pratishtha-tattva are collectively known as the Pratishtha-tattva.

=== Commentary on Dayabhaga ===
Raghunandana's Dayabhaga-tika, also known as the Dayabhaga-vyakhya[na], is a commentary on Jimutavahana's Hindu law treatise, the Dayabhaga. During the British Raj, when Hindu law was used in the courts, the Calcutta High Court termed Raghunandana's Dayabhaga-tika as the best commentary on the Dayabhaga. William Jones, a puisne judge at the Supreme Court of Judicature at Fort William, mentioned that the local Hindu scholars often referred to Jimutavahana's treatise, but it was Raghunandana's work that was "more generally approved" in Bengal.

The commentary quotes several other scholars and works, including Medhatithi, Kulluka Bhatta, the Mitakshara, the Vivada-Ratnakara of Chandeshvara Thakura, Shulapani and the Vivada-Chintamani of Vachaspati Mishra (often critically).

There have been some doubts about the authorship of this commentary. Both Henry Thomas Colebrooke (1810) and Julius Eggeling (1891) suspected that it was not authored by the writer of the Divya-tattva (that is, Raghunandana). However, Monmohan Chakravarti (1915) and Rajendra Chandra Hazra (1950) both attribute the work to Raghunandana. Pandurang Vaman Kane also ascribes the commentary to him, but not without hesitation.

=== Other works ===
His other works include:

- Gaya-shraddha paddhati which discusses special rites of shraddha to be performed while visiting Gaya
- Graha-yaga-tattva (or Graha-pramana-tattva) which discusses the rite of grahayajna (a special yajna performed to appease the 9 planets)
- Tirtha-yatra-tattva (or Tirtha-tattva) which discusses the procedure & rites related to pilgrimage
- Tripuskara-santi-tattva which discusses rites of pacification to be performed at a specific Hindu astronomical moment called Tripuskara-yoga
- Dvadasa-yatra-tattva (or Yatra-tattva) which discusses the observance of 12 special festivals performed in Puri
- Rasa-yatra tattva (or Rasa-yatra paddhati) which discusses the rite of observing Rasa-purnima (a festival observed by Hindus in Bengal, Odisha & Manipur on Kartika purnima commemorating the Raslila)
