= Dāya-Tattva =

Hindu law treatise written by Raghunandana

The Dāya-Tattva is a Hindu law treatise written by Raghunandana regarding the proper procedure for inheritance following the death of the father. It is considered by many to be a follow-up text to Jīmūtavāhana's digest, the Dāyabhāga. Raghunandana is considered to be a "disciple" of Jīmūtavāhana, and his texts subsequently differ only slightly from the Dāyabhāga.

== Translation ==
- The Dāya-Tattva was translated by the famous Hindu jurist, Golapcandra Sarkar.

== Topics covered in the digest ==
- Partitions made by the father
- Partition among brother's after their father's death
- Persons not entitled to a share
- Property not eligible for partition
- Inheritance procedure for one who dies without a son

== Location ==
The Dāya-Tattva is followed in the Bengal region of India. Raghunandana is considered by many to be one of Bengal's greatest jurists.
