= Noblewomen Playing Chess in the Zenana =

Indian painting

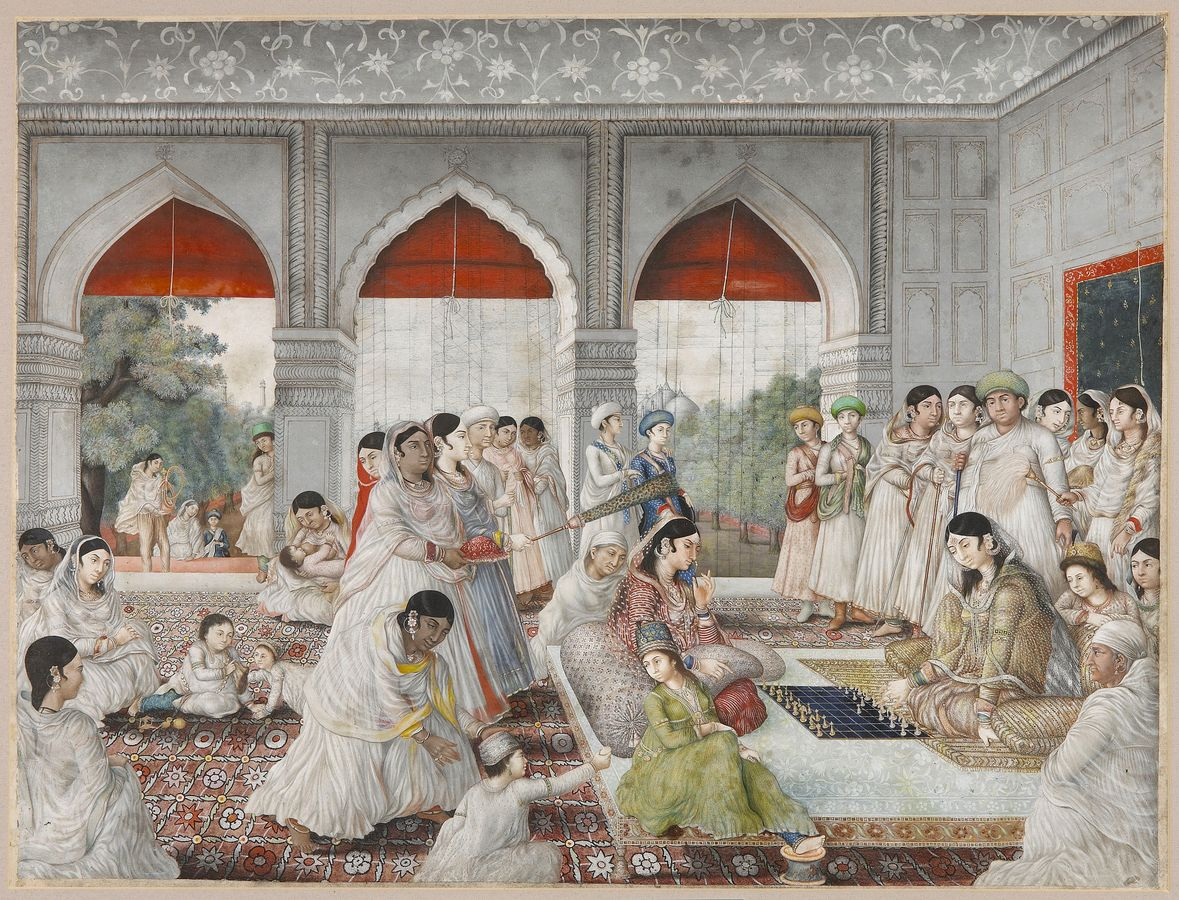
- Artist: Nevasi Lal
- Medium: Gouache on Paper
- Dimensions: 47cm (h) x 60cm (w)
- Location: Musée Guimet, Paris
- Accession: MA12112

Noblewomen Playing Chess in the Zenana is a gouache, attributed to the Indian artist Nevasi Lal (active during the period 1760-1800), a court painter of Awadh. He was active during the reign of Shuja-ud-Daula ( from 1754 to 1775), and Asaf-ud-Daula (who reigned from 1775 to 1797).

== Style, technique and subject of the painting ==
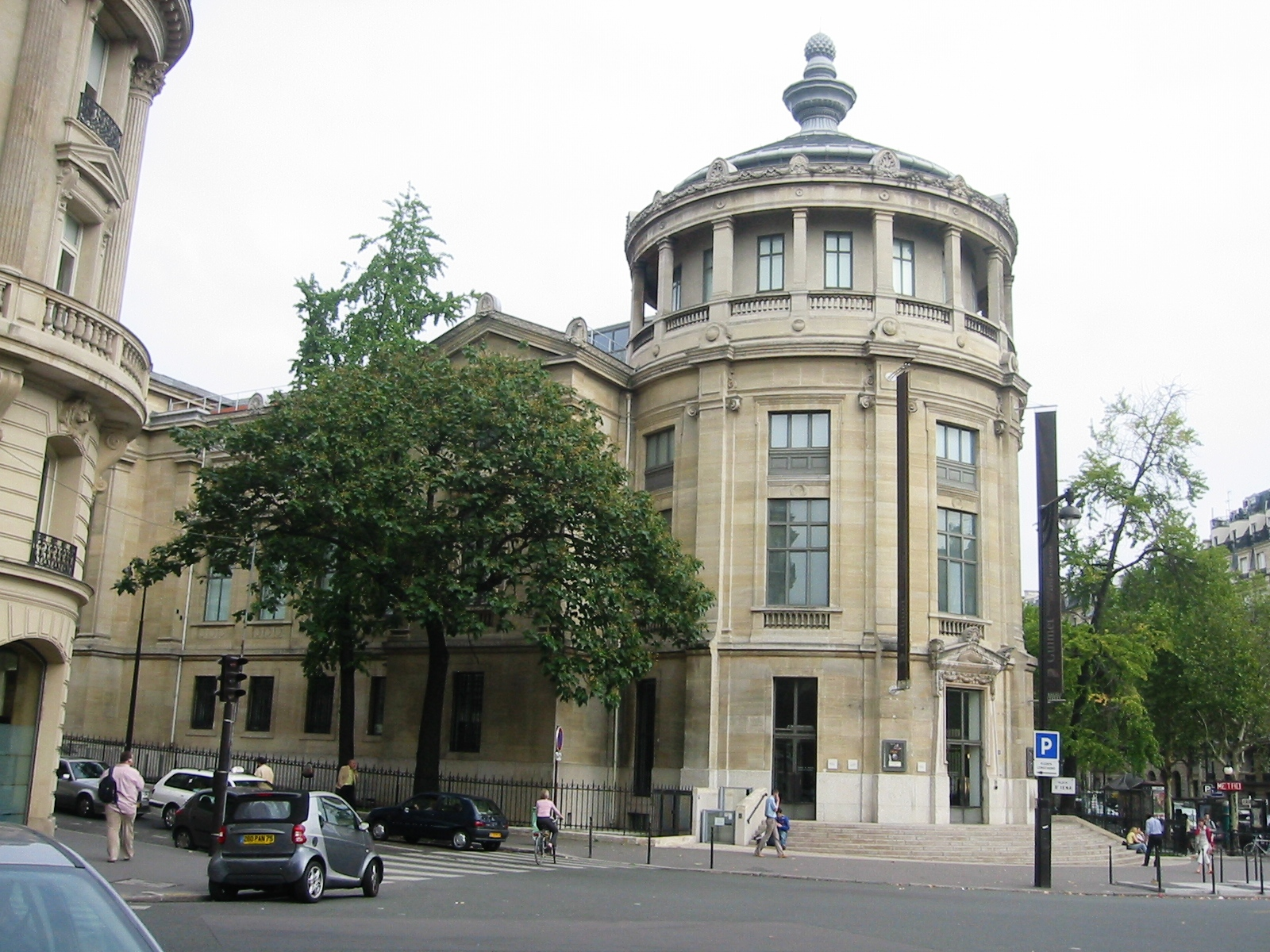
The Guimet Museum in Paris, where the gouache is located.

This painting is 47 × 62 cm in size and executed in gouache and gold on paper. It is currently at the National Museum of Asian Arts - Guimet, in Paris, France (inventory number MA 12112).

It is one of the few paintings that survived the siege of Lucknow during the Indian Rebellion of 1857-1858. Nevasi Lal, the artist to whom the gouache is attributed, worked in the city of Lucknow, in the second half of the 18th century. This gouache was created between 1780 and 1800.

=== Subject and composition ===
Two Indian aristocratic women play a game of shatranj . On a summer afternoon at the zenana, family members and servants gather to watch the game. The painter emphasizes the spontaneity, the naturalness of the characters: the children play together, the maids whisper, without being interested in the game, and in the background a mother breastfeeds her infant. A young girl hidden behind a column secretly observes what is happening in the room while another servant brings in the hookah.

The work combines elements from European painting ( skillful representation of perspective, chiaroscuro effects) and the tradition of local miniature in India.

Art critics suggest that the composition of this gouache may have been inspired by the paintings of British artist Tilly Kettle (1735-1786). Kettle had worked in India from 1768 to 1776, and many of his paintings ended up in Lucknow at the end of the century. They were still there until the sepoy uprising in 1857-1858, and were made available to local artists to make studies and copies.

==== The game of Shatranj (as seen in the painting) ====
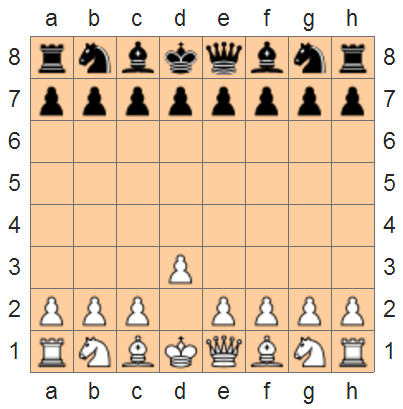
Reconstruction of the position of the chessboard pieces on the chatrang board

In shatranj, the game board is single-colored (a unique aspect of the game), and divided into fields by narrow white lines drawn on a black background. This is visible in the painting.

The game has just begun and only one piece has been moved. It can be assumed that it is the rules of the Indian shatranj that apply because the pawn is moved only one square while in European chess it can be moved two squares from the initial position. In the painting, the kings are not placed in E1 and E8 but in the unusual place of the queens d1 and d8 as is allowed in the shatranj.

The pieces though, are of standard European type and not of the type traditionally used for shatranj.

=== Henry Colebrooke ===
Henry Thomas Colebrooke, an eminent Sanskrit scholar, who lived in India from 1782 to 1814, is supposed to have brought this gouache back to England.

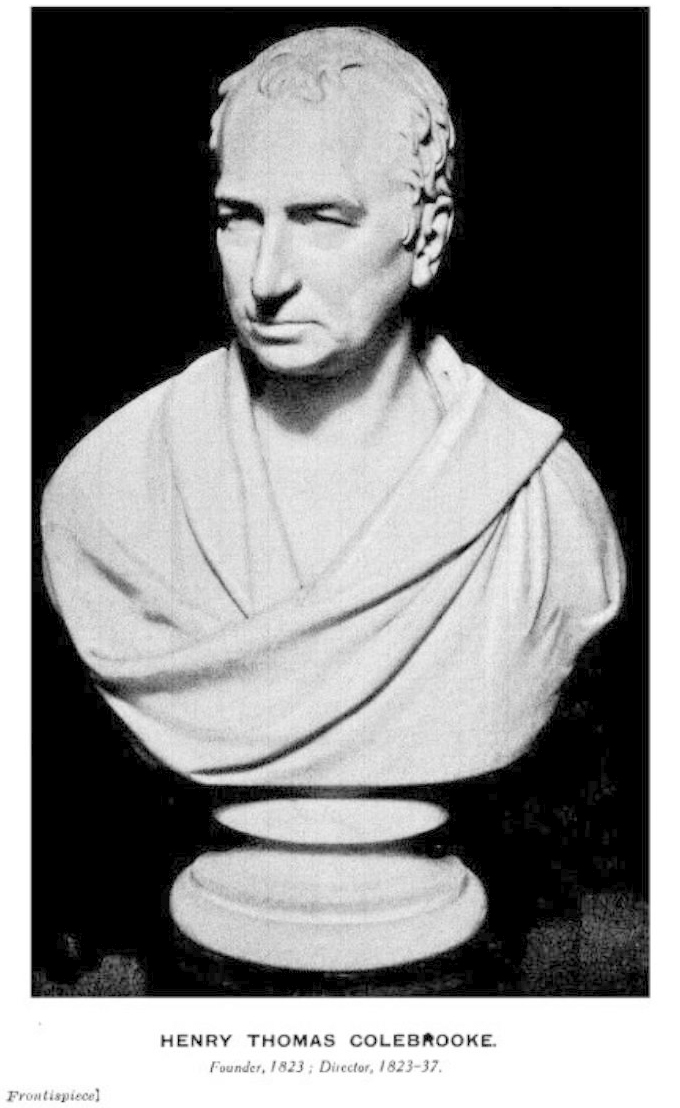
Henry Thomas Colebrooke

This Gouache has been exhibited several times in exhibitions devoted to Indian art of the 18th century.
