= Yogloka =

Yogloka (Note: Also called Yoglauka or Jogloka.) (fl. between 950 and 1050 CE) was a Sanskrit-language writer on dharma-shastra (Hindu law and conduct), who likely lived in the Bengal region of India. He has been cited by the later scholars Jimutavahana and Raghunandana, but his works are now lost.

== Date and place ==
The 12th century writer Jimutvahana, who cites Yogloka, refers to an "ancient" (purātana) manuscript of Yogloka's work, which suggests that Yogloka lived much before him. According to scholar Sures Chandra Banerji, he flourished in the 11th century or earlier. Scholar P. V. Kane theorizes that Yogloka flourished between 950 and 1050 CE.

Since the only extant works that cite Yogloka are by writers from the Bengal region, he was likely from Bengal too.

== Works ==
The works of Yogloka are now lost, but later writers Jimutvahana and Raghunandana cite him. Jimutvahana usually cites him to refute his views, and agrees with him very rarely; Yogloka is the most criticized writer by Jimutavahana. Jimutvahanaa's efforts to reject his views suggest that he was considered an authority by the 12th century. Raghunandana refers to him respectfully, and suggests that his views found favour among the writers of Mithila.

According to Jimutavahana's Kāla-viveka, Yogloka wrote on the subject of kāla, that is, determining the auspicious times for performance of religious rites. It suggests that Yogloka wrote two texts on the topic: a larger text titled Brhad-Yogloka and a smaller text titled Svalpa-Yogloka.

Jimutvahana's Vyavahara-matrka and Raghunandana's Vyavahara-tattva also cite Yogloka, suggesting that he wrote on the topic of legal procedure (vyavahara). The Vyavahara-matrka suggests that a chapter of his work on this topic was titled Karanottara-prakarana.
