= Ketana =

1. Bhaskaruni Ketana (1200-1250)
2. Mulaghatika Ketana (1220–1260)
