= History of Dharmaśāstra =

Hindu law book by Pandurang Vaman Kane

The History of Dharmaśāstra, with a subtitle "Ancient and Medieval Religious and Civil Law in India", is a monumental seven-volume work on Hindu law (dharmashastra) consisting of around 6,500 pages. It was authored by renowned Indologist Pandurang Vaman Kane. The first volume of the work was published in 1930 and the final one in 1962. The work is considered Kane's magnum opus in English.

This work researched the evolution of code of conduct in ancient and mediaeval India by looking into several texts and manuscripts compiled over the centuries. Dr Kane used the resources available at prestigious institutes such as the Asiatic Society of Mumbai and Bhandarkar Oriental Research Institute, among others. The work is known for its expanse and depth – ranging across diverse subjects such as the Mahabharata, the Puranas and Chanakya – including references to previously obscure sources. The richness in the work is attributed to his in-depth knowledge of Sanskrit. His success is believed to be an outcome of his objective study of the texts instead of deifying them.

Kane wrote the book Vyavaharamayukha and was in the process of writing an introductory passage on the history of Dharmaśāstra for this book, so that the reader would get an overall idea apart from the subject of the book. One thing led to another and this project snowballed into the major work that it is. All the same, he was categorical in saying that it is difficult to find an English equivalent of the word dharma. His output in the form of writings across the three languages of English, Sanskrit and Marathi span nearly 15,000 pages.
