= Vijñāneśvara =

Indian jurist

Vijnaneshvara (IAST: Vijñāneśvara) was a prominent 11th-12th century jurist from the Kalyani Chalukya kingdom of present-day Karnataka, India. His treatise, the Mitakshara, is one of the most influential legal treatises in Hindu law.

== Biography ==
According to Mitakshara, Vijnanesvara lived during the reign of the Chalukya king Vikramaditya VI (r. 1076-1126 CE), who ruled from Kalyana. He belonged to the family of the Bharadvaja gotra, and his father's name was Padmanabha-bhatta. He was the pupil of Uttama, and a student of the Purva-mimamsa school.

Scholar J. Duncan M. Derrett speculates that Vijnanesvara was a judge, but according to scholar P. V. Kane, there is no evidence for this. Kane notes that the author of Mitakshara describes himself as a "pandita" in a verse. The colophons of the Mitakshara manuscripts describe him as an ascetic (parama-hamsa) and a renunciant (parivrajaka). Therefore, Kane theorizes that the author was not an ascetic when he started the work, but became one shortly before or after its completition.

=== Identification with Vijñāneśvara of Martur inscription ===
A 1123-1124 CE inscripton found at the Sri Kalingeshwara Temple in Martur (in Kalaburagi district) mentions Vijnanesvara-Bhattaraka, who appears to have been an advisor and guru of the Chalukya emperor Vikramaditya VI. According to the inscription, Vijñāneśvara was born in Maseyamadu (present-day Masimadu or Masemadu in the Bhalki taluka). His original name was Kancha, and "Vijñāneśvara" was a probably title meant to recognize his scholarly work. The emperor Vikramaditya VI held him in high regard, and touched his feet in reverence.

According to a section of historians, the Vijñāneśvara of the Martur inscription is same as the author of Mitakshara. These scholars include P. B. Desai, V. S. Kulkarni, and J. M. Nagaiah.

However, other scholars such as Sitaram Jagirdar and M. M. Kalburgi dispute this identification. According to Mitakshara copies, Vijnanesvara was a son of Padmanabha and belonged to the Bharadvaja gotra. However, according to the Martur inscription, Vijnanesvara-Bhattaraka alias Kamcha was a son of Soma-raja of Kaushika gotra. According to Kane, it is possible that Soma-raja was another name of Padmanabha, and the gotra may have changed because of an adoption, but there is no concrete evidence to support such guesswork.

Despite the debated identification, several people continue to associate Martur with the author of Mitakshara. Vijñāneśvara Pratisthana Trust, an organization founded by politician and judge Rama Jois, established a research and study centre named Vijñāneśvara Bhavan at Martur in 2004. The Karnataka State Government allocated ₹ 10 million to develop the 6-acre Vijnaneshwara Park adjacent to the Bhavan. The Government also established the Vijñāneśvara Government Law College in Martur, which was later shifted to the nearby Gulbarga University campus.

== Works ==
An 18th-century manuscript of the Mitakshara

Vijñāneśvara wrote Ṛjumitākṣarā, better known as Mitakshara, a detail commentary on Yājñavalkya Smṛti. The work became an authoritative text on law in India. Kane theorizes that the composition of a large work like Mitakshara must have taken several years, and places it between 1100-1120 CE. Derret assigns it to the period 1121-1125 CE, which Kane considers wrong.

Vijñāneśvara also appears to have written a work titled Ashaucha-dashaka (IAST: Āśauca-daśaka), alternatively titled Dasha-shloki (Daśaślokī), a treatise on ritual impurity. Hari-hara, who was probably a pupil of Vijñāneśvara, appears to have written a commentary on this work. Some sources, however, suggest that Hari-hara was the author of the work, and that Vijñāneśvara wrote the commentary on it.

Trimshat Shloki (Triṃśat-ślokī or "thirty verses"), another dharma-shastra text, is also attributed to Vijñāneśvara. However, this attribution is highly doubtful: the text was likely written by a later writer who drew largely from the Mitakshara.

Vijñāneśvara's student Nārāyaṇa wrote Vyavahara-shiromani (Vyavahāra-śiromaṇi), a legal digest on judicial procedure (vyavahāra) and civil law.
