= Medhātithi =

One of the oldest and most famous commentators on the Manusmṛti

Medhātithi is one of the oldest and most famous commentators on the Manusmṛti, more commonly known as the Laws of Manu. The Manusmṛti text is a part of the Hindu Dharmaśāstra tradition, which attempts to record the laws of dharma.

== Location ==
There is some debate over the exact location in which Medhātithi composed his commentary, but there is significant evidence which places him in Kashmir. Julius Jolly argues that he was an inhabitant of Southern India, while Georg Bühler argues (and P. V. Kane tends to agree) that he was a Kashmirian, or at least an inhabitant of Northern India. Robert Lingat does not acknowledge a debate about Medhātithi's origin, stating explicitly "one knows nothing about him save that he lived in Kashmir."

== Dating and historical context ==
As with most ancient texts, the exact date that Medhātithi's commentary was written is unknown. Kane argues that, because Medhātithi names several other commentators that are dated earlier than he is, and because the author of the Mitākṣarā (a commentary on the Yajnavalkya Smriti) considers him as authoritative, he has to be writing later than 820 CE and before 1050 CE. Lingat places him in the ninth century or in the early tenth century at the latest. David Brick, in his 2010 review of historical literature on widow burning, places him about 1000 CE.
