= Henry Thomas Colebrooke =

English orientalist and mathematician (1765–1837)

Henry Thomas Colebrooke FRS FRSE FLS
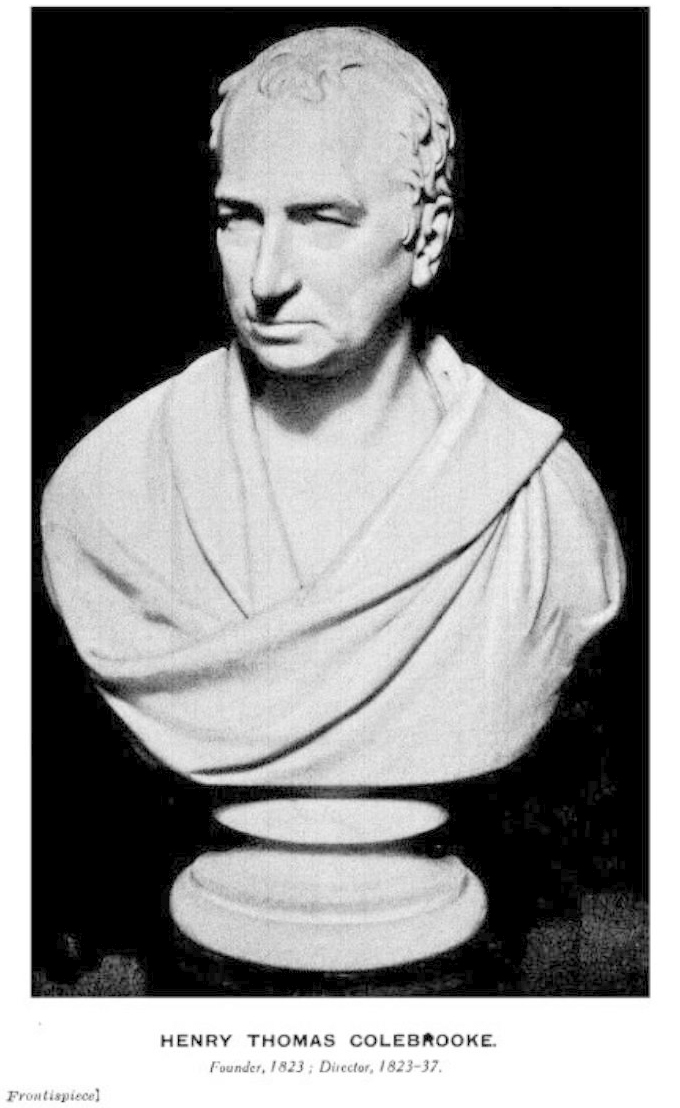
- A bust of Henry Thomas Colebrooke currently owned by the Royal Asiatic Society
- Born: 15 June 1765; London, England
- Died: 10 March 1837 (aged 71); London, England
- Occupation: Orientalist
- Known for: Sanskrit scholar, one of the founders of the Royal Asiatic Society, one of the founders and second president of the Royal Astronomical Society
- Father: George Colebrooke

Henry Thomas Colebrooke FRS FRSE FLS (15 June 1765 – 10 March 1837) was an English orientalist and botanist. He has been described as "the first great Sanskrit scholar in Europe".

== Biography ==
Henry Thomas Colebrooke was born on 15 June 1765. His parents were Sir George Colebrooke, 2nd Baronet, MP for Arundel and Chairman of the East India Company from 1769, and Mary Gaynor, daughter and heir of Patrick Gaynor of Antigua. He was educated at home, and from the age of twelve to sixteen he lived in France.

In 1782 Colebrooke was appointed through his father's influence to a writership with the East India Company in Calcutta. In 1786 and three years later he was appointed assistant collector in the revenue department at Tirhut. He wrote Remarks on the Husbandry and Commerce of Bengal, which was privately published in 1795, by which time he had transferred to Purnia. This opposed the East India Company's monopoly on Indian trade, advocating instead for free trade between Britain and India, which caused offence to the East India Company's governors.

He was appointed to the magistracy of Mirzapur in 1795 and was sent to Nagpur in 1799 to negotiate an allowance with the Raja of Berar. He was unsuccessful in this, due to events elsewhere, and returned in 1801. On his return was made a judge of the new court of appeal in Calcutta, of which he became president of the bench in 1805. Also in 1805, Lord Wellesley appointed him honorary professor of Hindu law and Sanskrit at the college of Fort William. In 1807 he became a member of council, serving for five years, and was elected President of the Asiatic Society of Calcutta. Colebrooke married Elizabeth Wilkinson in 1810. The marriage was short-lived and she died in 1814. He returned to England in 1815.

In 1816 he was elected to the fellowship of both the Royal Society and the Royal Society of Edinburgh In 1820 he was a founder of the Royal Astronomical Society. He often chaired the society's meetings in the absence of the first president, William Herschel, and was elected as its second president on Herschel's death, serving 1823–1825. In 1823 he was also a founder of the Royal Asiatic Society, chairing its first meeting although he declined to become its president.

== Works ==
After eleven years of residence in India, Colebrooke began the study of the Sanskrit language; and to him was entrusted the translation of the major Digest of Hindu Laws, a monumental study of Hindu law which had been left unfinished by Sir William Jones. He translated the two treatises, the Mitacshara of Vijnaneshwara and the Dayabhaga of Jimutavahana, under the title Law of Inheritance. During his residence at Calcutta he wrote his Sanskrit Grammar (1805), some papers on the religious ceremonies of the Hindus, and his Essay on the Vedas (1805), for a long time the standard work in English on the subject. A posthumous essay on his father's life was published by Sir T. E. Colebrooke in 1873 as part of a reprinting of Miscellaneous Essays.

He collected plants in the Sylhet Division and sent plants and drawings to William Jackson Hooker and Aylmer Bourke Lambert. Colebrooke's botanical specimens are stored at Kew Gardens.

=== Indological ===
- Remarks on the Husbandry and Internal Commerce of Bengal (Revised ed.). Calcutta. 1804 [1795]. OCLC 81391410.
- A Grammar of the Sanscrit Language. Calcutta: Honorable Company's Press. 1804. OCLC 1086520079.
- Cosha or Dictionary of the Sanscrit Language. Serampoor. 1808. OCLC 1040332244. (by Amara Singh; with an English interpretation and annotations by H.T. Colebrooke)
- Two Treatises on the Hindu Law of Inheritance. Calcutta: Hindoostanee Press. 1810. OCLC 246404698.
- Algebra, with Arithmetic and Mensuration, from the Sanscrit of Brahmegupta and Bháscara. London: John Murray. 1817. OCLC 54570166.
- Treatise on Obligations and Contracts. London: Black, Kingsbury, Parbury, and Allen. 1818. OCLC 900298882.
- Miscellaneous Essays. Vol. 1. London: Wm. H. Allen. 1837.
- Miscellaneous Essays. Vol. 2. London: Wm. H. Allen. 1837.
- The Sánkhya Káriká, or Memorial Verses on the Sánkhya Philosophy by Iswara Krishna (also, The Bhashya or Commentary of Gaurapada, translated... by Horace Hayman Wilson). Oxford: Oriental Translation Fund of Great Britain and Ireland. 1837. OCLC 222040333.

=== Botanical ===
- "Description of Select Indian Plants". Transactions of the Linnean Society of London. 12 (2): 351–361. 1819. doi:10.1111/j.1095-8339.1817.tb00234.x.
- "On the Indian Species of Menispermum". Transactions of the Linnean Society of London. 13: 44–68. 1821. doi:10.1111/j.1095-8339.1821.tb00054.x.
- "Account of the Lansium and some other Genera of Malayan Plants". Transactions of the Linnean Society of London. 14: 114–130. 1823. (with William Jack)
- "On Boswellia and certain Indian Terebinthaceœ". Transactions of the Linnean Society of London. 15 (2): 355–370. 1826. doi:10.1111/j.1095-8339.1826.tb00119.x.
