= Jimutavahana =

Indian Sanskrit scholar

Jīmūtavāhana (c. 12th century) was an Indian Sanskrit scholar and writer of legal and religious treatises on Vaishnavism of early medieval period. He was the earliest writer on smriti (law) from Bengal whose texts are extant.

== Major works ==
Jīmūtavāhana is known for his three major works. These three works are probably the parts of a bigger comprehensive digest, the Dharma Ratna.

His Kalaviveka is an exhaustive analysis of the auspicious kala (timings) for the performance of religious rites and ceremonies. This text also contains discussions on solar and lunar months. Based on the evidence of the last of a number of exact dates examined in this text, it is assumed that the text was written soon after March, 1093.

His Vyvahāra-mātrikā or Nyayaratna-mātrikā or Nyayamātrikā has dealt with vyavahāra (judicial procedure). The text is divided into five sections, Vyvaharamukha, Bhashapada, Uttarapada, Kriyapada and Nirnayapada.

His magnum opus Dāyabhāga has dealt with the laws of inheritance based on various dharma-shastras. In Bengal (and post-independence West Bengal and Tripura) and Assam, Dāyabhāga was the principal guide for laws on inheritance till the enactment of the Hindu Succession Act, 1956. This treatise differs in some aspects from Mitakshara, which was prevalent in other parts of India based on Yajnavalkya Smrti. The right of a widow without any male issue to inherit the properties of her deceased husband is recognized in Dāyabhāga.

Dayabhagatippani of Srinath Acharyachudamani (c. 16th century), Dayabhagatika of Raghunandan Bhattacharya (16th century) and Dayabhagatika of Srikrishna Tarkalankar (18th century) are the notable commentaries written on Dayabhaga during the late medieval period.

== Influences ==
Jimutavahana cites the earlier scholar Jitendriya in all three of his major works: his works appear to have overshadowed Jitendriya's writings on dharma-shastra , and rendered them obsolete to the later writers. Jimutavahana cites Bālaka in support of his own views only once, but otherwise refutes Bālaka's views. Similarly, Jimutavahana cites Yogloka mostly to refute his views.

== See also ==
- Dāyabhāga
