= Pitambara Sidhanta Vagisa =

Pitambara Siddhanta Vagisa Bhattacharyya
- Born: 1530; Kamrup
- Died: 1620 (aged 89–90)
- Occupation: Smriti writer
- Writing career
- Language: Kamrupi
- Notable works: Gudhartha- prakasika on Laksmanacarya's Saradatilaka, Tirtha Kaumudi

Pitambara Sidhanta Vagisa (1530-1620) was 16th century litterateur from Kamrup and contemporary of likes of Damodara Mishra.

== Works ==
Smriti writers Pitambara Siddhantavagisa, Damodar Misra & Shambhunatha Siddhantavagisha and others developed what may be called a Kamarupa school of Dharmashastra. It was royal patronage from the Kamata kingdom, & later the Ahom kingdom that helped in the dissemination of Sanskrit learning and culture throughout the Brahmaputra valley.

Under the patronage of the Kamata king Naranarayana, Siddhantavagisha wrote 18 Smriti digests. Brihat Rajavamshavali of King Harendranarayana of Coochbihar records their names as

1. Danda kaumudi - dealing with criminal law
2. Preta kaumudi - dealing with funerary rites & afterlife
3. Vrishotsarga kaumudi - dealing with the rite of vrishotsarga
4. Pramana kaumudi - dealing with judicial procedure
5. Shraddha kaumudi - dealing with sraddha ceremony
6. Durgotsava kaumudi - dealing with Durga Puja
7. Ekadashi kaumudi - dealing with rites to be performed on ekadashi
8. Shuddhi kaumudi - dealing with rites of purification
9. Pratistha kaumudi - dealing with rites of consecration
10. Sankalpa kaumudi - dealing with the rites of sankalpa
11. Prayascitta kaumudi - dealing with the rites of penitence
12. Tirtha kaumudi - dealing with the rites of pilgrimage
13. Kala kaumudi - dealing with festivals to be celebrated throughout the year
14. Diksha kaumudi - dealing with the rites of initiation
15. Sambandha kaumudi - dealing with the concept of family relationships & choice of potential spouses
16. Tithi kaumudi - dealing with rites to be observed on specific days of the fortnight
17. Daya kaumudi - dealing with laws of inheritance
18. Achara kaumudi - dealing with proper conduct

Siddhantavagisha is also stated to have authored a Sanskrit drama named Usha-harana, dealing with the affair of Usha, the daughter of the Prahlada's great-grandson Banasura (who is believed to have reigned from Sonitpur) with Aniruddha, the grandson of Krishna as described in the Harivamsa & a Gudhartha-dipika, a commentary on the 11th century Tantrika manual named Sharadatilaka Tantra.

== See also ==
- Ananta Kandali
- Bhusana Dvija
- List of Indian writers
- Assamese literature
