= Dāyabhāga =

Hindu law treatise written by Jīmūtavāhana

The Dāyabhāga is a Hindu law treatise written by Jīmūtavāhana which primarily focuses on inheritance procedure. The Dāyabhāga was the strongest authority in Modern British Indian courts in the Bengal region of India, although this has changed due to the passage of the Hindu Succession Act of 1956 and subsequent revisions to the act. Based on Jīmūtavāhana's criticisms of the Mitākṣarā, it is thought that his work is preceded by the Mitākṣarā. This has led many scholars to conclude that the Mitākṣarā represents the orthodox doctrine of Hindu law, while the Dāyabhāga represents the reformed version.

The central difference between the texts is based upon when one becomes the owner of property. The Dāyabhāga does not give the sons a right to their father's ancestral property until after his death, unlike Mitākṣarā, which gives the sons the right to ancestral property upon their birth. The digest has been commented on more than a dozen times.

== Translation ==
=== Henry Thomas Colebrooke ===
Henry Thomas Colebrooke translated the Dāyabhāga in 1810 through the use of manuscripts and pandits. Colebrooke, a Calcutta Supreme Court judge, broke the text into chapters and verses which were not in the original text and is often criticized for numerous errors in translation. Rocher believes the mistakes were due to three factors:

1. The format of the Sanskrit texts
2. The texts were deeply involved with an ancient civilization, which the translators were not familiar with
3. The misconception that the text was written by lawyers, for lawyers

Colebrooke created the division of two schools of thought in India, separating the majority of India, thought to follow the Mitākṣarā and the Bengal region, which followed the Dāyabhāga system.

== Topics covered in the digest ==
- Partition of the father and grandfather's property
- Inheritance procedure among brothers after the death of the father
- Those excluded from inheritance due to disabilities
- The order of succession of one who dies without a son

== Sages mentioned in the Dāyabhāga ==
- Manu: Among Smrtis, Manu is quoted the most frequently by Jīmūtavāhana.
- Yajnavalkya
- Visnu
- Narada
- Bṛhaspati
- Katyayana
- Vyasa

== Central differences between the Dāyabhāga and the Mitākṣarā ==
=== Son's inheritance ===
- The son has no right to the father's ancestral property until after his death, or the father's ownership becomes extinct through other means, such as being excluded from the caste or becoming ascetic. This is in direct contrast to the Mitākṣarā, which gives the sons a claim upon birth.

=== The rights of the widow ===
- The widow succeeds the husband's property rights on his death, not in their own right, but representing him, even in cases where husband held property jointly with his brother.

=== Ancestral property ===
Dāyabhāga states that the father is the sole ruler of all property, both ancestral and personal. Unlike the Mitākṣarā, ancestral property is not seen as communal, therefore the father does not require the consent of his sons to act over the ancestral property. The essential difference between the Dāyabhāga and the Mitākṣarā family is that the Dāyabhāga sees no difference between the father's total control over ancestral and personal property.

=== Personal property ===
- The father has the right to do as he wishes with his personal property in both the Mitākṣarā and the Dāyabhāga.

== Inheritance ==
=== Succession ===
- After the father's death, the sons will succeed his portion of the ancestral property. This can be done during the father's lifetime, but only if the father chooses to do so. The property is not communally owned by the family, as it is in the Mitākṣarā. Each son has the ability to do what he wishes with his portion of the property after his father's death.

== Dharmaratna ==
- The Dāyabhāga is one of three recovered parts of Jīmūtavāhana's digest, the Dharmaratna. Only the Dāyabhāga has been commented on.

The other surviving parts include:

=== Vyavahāra-Mātrkā ===
Focuses on the Vyavahāra, or judicial procedure. Covers the four traditional areas of jurisprudence:

- Plaint
- Reply
- Evidence
- Decision

=== Kāla-Viveka ===
Focuses on the appropriate times for the performance of religious duties and sacrifices.

== Commentaries ==
More than a dozen commentaries have been written on the Dāyabhāga. Pandurang Vaman Kane lists the most important commentators as:

=== Śrīnātha Ācāryacūda ===
- Dāyabhāga-ṭippaṇī
- (1470-1540)
- The oldest commentary on the Dāyabhāga.
- Ācāryacūda was the teacher of jurist Raghunandana.

=== Rāmabhadra Nyāylankāra ===
- Dāyabhāga-vivṛti
- (1510-1570)
- Son of Śrīnātha Ācāryacūda, often defended his father against the criticism of Cakraviartin in his commentaries.

=== Acyutānanda Cakraviartin ===
- Dāyabhāga-siddhāntakumudacandrikā
- (1510-1570)
- Often critical of Ācāryacūda's commentary through the use of extensive quotations.

=== Maheśvara Bhaṭṭācārya ===
- Dāyabhāga-ṭīkā
- (1530-1600)

=== Śrīksṛṣṇa ===
- Dāyabhāga-probidhinī
- (Mid 18th century)
- Considered to be the most popular of all Dāyabhāga commentators, with most editions of the Dāyabhāga containing his commentary.

=== Raghunandana ===
Raghunandana (c. 16th century) was the author of the Dāya-Tattva. Dayabhaga tika (or Dayabhaga vyakhya), a commentary on Dayabhaga, is also attributed to him.

Whether this commentary was actually done by Raghunandana, or another scholar using his name, is a topic of debate. Henry Thomas Colebrooke (1810) and Julius Eggeling (1891) suspected that it was not authored by him. Monmohan Chakravarti (1915), Rajendra Chandra Hazra (1950) and Pandurang Vaman Kane (1972), on the other hand, ascribed the work to Raghunandana.

The commentary retained high standing and was used in court to answer disputed questions of Dāyabhāga. The Calcutta High Court declared that Raghunandana's commentary of the Dāyabhāga is the best of all commentaries.

== Dating ==
The time of the writing is a topic of debate in the Hindu Law field. Many of the previous authors to which Jīmūtavāhana refers have been lost. Scholars such as Rājkumār Sarvādhikārī estimate his writing to have occurred in the fifteenth century, yet Dr. Pandurang Vaman Kāne believes he wrote between 1090 and 1130. Commentaries and names mentioned in the Dāyabhāga prove that Jīmūtavāhana cannot be placed earlier than 1125 AD. The vast differences between scholars appear on later dates.

== Location ==
The provisions relating to property rights are followed in West Bengal, Bihar, Purvanchal, Jharkhand, Odisha and Assam.

== Hindu Succession Act ==
- The Hindu Succession Act (Act No. 30 of 1956) resulted in many changes being made to both the Mitākṣarā and the Dāyabhāga systems regarding succession and partition.
