= Hindu law =

Legal traditions in Hinduism

Hindu law, as a historical term, refers to the code of laws applied to Hindus, Buddhists, Jains and Sikhs in British India. Hindu law, in modern scholarship, also refers to the legal theory, jurisprudence and philosophical reflections on the nature of law discovered in ancient and medieval era Indian texts. It is one of the oldest known jurisprudence theories in the world, beginning three thousand years ago, and is based on the Hindu texts.

Hindu tradition, in its surviving ancient texts, does not universally express the law in the canonical sense of ius or of lex. The ancient term in Indian texts is Dharma, which means more than a code of law, though collections of legal maxims were compiled into works such as the Nāradasmṛti. The term "Hindu law" is a colonial construction, and emerged after the colonial rule arrived in Indian subcontinent, and when in 1772 it was decided by British colonial officials, that European common law system would not be implemented in India, that Hindus of India would be ruled under their "Hindu law" and Muslims of India would be ruled under "Muslim law" (Sharia).

The substance of Hindu law implemented by the British was derived from a Dharmaśāstra named Manusmriti, one of the many treatises (śāstra) on Dharma. The British, however, mistook the Dharmaśāstra as codes of law and failed to recognise that these Sanskrit texts were not used as statements of positive law until the British colonial officials chose to do so. Rather, Dharmaśāstra contained jurisprudence commentary, i.e., a theoretical reflection upon practical law, but not a statement of the law of the land as such. Scholars have also questioned the authenticity and the corruption in the Manusmriti manuscript used to derive the colonial era Hindu law.

In colonial history context, the construction and implementation of Hindu law and Islamic law was an attempt at "legal pluralism" during the British colonial era, where people in the same region were subjected to different civil and criminal laws based on the religion of the plaintiff and defendant. Legal scholars state that this divided the Indian society, and that Indian law and politics have ever since vacillated between "legal pluralism – the notion that religion is the basic unit of society and different religions must have different legal rights and obligations" and "legal universalism – the notion that individuals are the basic unit of society and all citizens must have uniform legal rights and obligations".

== Terminology and nomenclature ==
In Hinduism, law is discussed as a subset of dharma which signifies behaviors that are considered in accord with rta, the order that makes life and the universe possible, (Note: The Oxford Dictionary of World Religions: "In Hinduism, dharma is a fundamental concept, referring to the order and custom which make life and a universe possible, and thus to the behaviours appropriate to the maintenance of that order.") and includes duties, rights, laws, conduct, virtues and right way of living. The concept of Dharma includes Hindu law.

In ancient texts of Hinduism, the concept of dharma incorporates the principles of law, order, harmony, and truth. It is explained as the necessary law of life and equated to satya (Sanskrit: सत्यं, truth), in hymn 1.4.14 of Brhadaranyaka Upanishad, as follows:

धर्मः तस्माद्धर्मात् परं नास्त्य् अथो अबलीयान् बलीयाँसमाशँसते धर्मेण यथा राज्ञैवम् ।

यो वै स धर्मः सत्यं वै तत् तस्मात्सत्यं वदन्तमाहुर् धर्मं वदतीति धर्मं वा वदन्तँ सत्यं वदतीत्य् एतद्ध्येवैतदुभयं भवति ।।

Nothing is higher than Dharma. The weak overcomes the stronger by Dharma, as over a king. Truly that Dharma is the Truth (Satya); Therefore, when a man speaks the Truth, they say, "He speaks the Dharma"; and if he speaks Dharma, they say, "He speaks the Truth!" For both are one.

— Brihadaranyaka Upanishad, 1.4.xiv

=== Related terms ===
In ancient Hindu jurisprudence texts, a number of Sanskrit words refer to aspects of law. Some of these include Niyama (Sanskrit: नियम, rule), Nyaya (न्याय, justice), Yuktata (युक्तता, justice), Samya (साम्य, equality and impartiality in law), Vidhi (विधि, precept or rule), Vyavastha (व्यवस्था, regulation), Sambhasa (सम्भाषा, contract or mutual engagement), Prasamvida-patra (प्रसंविदा-पत्र, written contract), Vivadayati (विवादयति, litigate or dispute), Adhivakta (अधिवक्ता, lawyer), Nyayavadi (न्यायवादी, male lawyer), Nyayavadini (न्यायवादिनी, female lawyer), Nyayadata (न्यायदाता, judge), Danda (दण्ड, punishment, penalty or fine), among others.

== Classical Hindu law ==
John Mayne, in 1910, wrote that the classical Hindu law has the oldest pedigree of any known system of jurisprudence. Mayne noted that while being ancient, the conflicting texts on almost every question presents a great difficulty in deciding what the classical Hindu law was. As more literature emerges, and is translated or interpreted, Mayne noted that the conflict between the texts on every matter of law has multiplied, and that there is a lack of consensus between the Western legal scholars resident in India.

Ludo Rocher states that Hindu tradition does not express law in the sense of ius nor of lex. The term "Hindu law" is a colonial construction, and emerged when the colonial rule arrived in South Asia, and when in 1772 it was decided by British colonial officials in consultation with Mughal rulers, that European common law system would not be implemented in India, that Hindus of India would be ruled under their "Hindu law" and Muslims of India would be ruled under sharia (Muslim law). However, Hindu law was neither mentioned, nor in use, nor codified, during the 600 years of Islamic rule of India. An attempt was made to find any old surviving Sanskrit text that mentioned elements of law, and this is how Western editors and translators arrived at the equation that "dharma shastra equals lawbook, code or Institute", states Rocher.

Scholars such as Derrett, Menski and others have repeatedly asked whether and what evidence there is that the Dharmasastras were the actual legal authority before and during the Islamic rule in India. They have also questioned whether the Dharmasastras contain "precepts" or "recommendations", that is whether the jurisprudence mentioned in Dharmasastras was actually ever used in disputes in Indian society. Early scholars during the British colonial rule such as John Mayne suggested that it is probable that Dharma-smriti texts reflect the "practical administration of law", at least before the arrival of Islam in India. However, most later scholars state that Dharma texts of Hinduism are "purely or mostly concerned with moral and religious norms which have some but not a very close relationship to legal practice". A few scholars have suggested that the Dharma-related Smritis such as Manusmriti, Naradasmriti and Parashara Smriti do not embody the Hindu law but are commentaries and scholarly notes on more ancient authoritative legal texts that have been lost or yet to be found.

Classical Hindu law, states Donald Davis, "represents one of the least known, yet most sophisticated traditions of legal theory and jurisprudence in world history. Hindu jurisprudential texts contain elaborate and careful philosophical reflections on the nature of law and religion. The nature of Hindu law as a tradition has been subject to some debate and some misunderstanding both within and especially outside of specialist circles."

In South India, temples were intimately involved in the administration of law.

=== Sources of Dharma ===
Śruti have been considered as the authority in the Hindu Dharma. (Note: Elisa Freschi (2012): The Vedas are not deontic authorities in the absolute sense and may be disobeyed, but still recognized as an epistemic authority in Hindu dharma; (note: this differentiation between epistemic and deontic authority is true for all Indian religions).) The Smritis, such as Manusmriti, Naradasmriti and Parashara Smriti, contribute to the exposition of the Hindu Dharma but are considered less authoritative than Śrutis (the Vedic corpus that includes early Upanishads). (Note: A Smriti is a derivative work, has less epistemic authority than the Vedas, and does not have any deontic authority in Hindu dharma.) The root texts of ancient Hindu jurisprudence and law are the Dharma-sūtras. These express that the Shruti, Smriti and Achara are sources of jurisprudence and law. The precedence of these sources is declared in the opening verses of each of the known, surviving Dharma-sūtras. For example,

The source of Dharma is the Veda, as well as the tradition [Smriti], and practice of those who know the Veda. – Gautama Dharma-sūtra 1.1-1.2

The Dharma is taught in each Veda, in accordance with which we will explain it. What is given in the tradition [Smriti] is the second, and the conventions of cultured people are the third. – Baudhayana Dharma-sūtra 1.1.1-1.1.4

The Dharma is set forth in the vedas and the Traditional Texts [Smriti]. When these do not address an issue, the practice of cultured people becomes authoritative. – Vāsiṣṭha Dharma-sūtra 1.4-1.5

— Translated by Donald Davis, The Spirit of Hindu Law

The Smritis, such as Manusmriti, Naradasmriti, Yajnavalkya Smrti and Parashara Smriti, expanded this definition, as follows,

वेदोऽखिलो धर्ममूलं स्मृतिशीले च तद्विदाम् । आचारश्चैव साधूनामात्मनस्तुष्टिरेव च ॥

Translation 1: The whole Veda is the (first) source of the sacred law, next the tradition and the virtuous conduct of those who know the (Veda further), also the customs of holy men, and (finally) self-satisfaction (Atmanastushti).
Translation 2: The root of the religion is the entire Veda, and (then) the tradition and customs of those who know (the Veda), and the conduct of virtuous people, and what is satisfactory to oneself.

— Manusmriti 2.6

वेदः स्मृतिः सदाचारः स्वस्य च प्रियमात्मनः । एतच्चतुर्विधं प्राहुः साक्षाद् धर्मस्य लक्षणम् ॥

Translation 1: The Veda, the sacred tradition, the customs of virtuous men, and one's own pleasure, they declare to be the fourfold means of defining the sacred law.
Translation 2: The Veda, tradition, the conduct of good people, and what is pleasing to oneself – they say that is four fold mark of religion.

— Manusmriti 2.12

As a source of Dharma, only three of the four types of texts in the Vedas have behavioral precepts. Lingat notes (abridged),

For the Hindu all belief takes its source and its justification in the Vedas [Śruti]. Consequently every rule of dharma must find its foundation in the Veda. Strictly speaking, the Samhitas do not even include a single precept which could be used directly as a rule of conduct. One can find there only references to usage which falls within the scope of dharma. By contrast, the Brahmanas, the Aranyakas and the Upanishads contain numerous precepts which propound rules governing behavior.

— Robert Lingat

Bilimoria states the role of Shruti in Hindu Dharma has been inspired by "the belief in a higher natural cosmic order (Rta succeeded later by the concept Dharma) that regulates the universe and provides the basis for its growth, flourishing and sustenance – be that of the gods, human beings, animals and eco-formations".

Levinson states that the role of Shruti and Smriti in Hindu law is as a source of guidance, and its tradition cultivates the principle that "the facts and circumstances of any particular case determine what is good or bad". The later Hindu texts include fourfold sources of Dharma, states Levinson, which include Atmanastushti (satisfaction of one's conscience), Sadachara (local norms of virtuous individuals), Smriti and Sruti.

==== Cited texts ====
Unlike the Bible & Quran, the Vedas don't discuss about societal matters directly. Classical Hindu law is derived from the following sources

===== Dharmasutra =====
As a part of the Kalpa texts within the Vedanga corpus of literature, they deal with personal conduct (alongside the Grihya Sutras) & social regulations in accordance to the principles of the Vedas. The texts are

Veda	Dharmasutra
Rigveda	Vasistha Dharmasutra
Samaveda	Gautama Dharmasutra
Krishna Yajurveda	Apastambha Dharmasutra Harita Dharmasutra Hiranyakesi Dharmasutra Vaikhanasa Dharmasutra Vishnu Dharmasutra
Sukla Yajurveda	Sankha-Likhita Dharmasutra
Atharvaveda	Aushanasa Dharmasutra

===== Dharmashastra =====
These texts, whose authorships are traditionally attributed to the Vedic sages, elaborate the topics discussed in the dharmasutras.

Dharmashastras available in printed format are

1. Angirasa smriti
2. Atri smriti
3. Apastambha smriti
4. Aushanasa smriti
5. Brihaspati smriti
6. Brihat Parashara smriti
7. Daksha smriti
8. Devala smriti
9. Gobhila smriti
10. Gautama smriti
11. Harita smriti
12. Katyayana smriti
13. Kashyapa smriti
14. Laghu Atri smriti
15. Laghu Harita smriti
16. Laghu Vishnu smriti
17. Laghu Shankha smriti
18. Likhita smriti
19. Manu smriti
20. Narada smriti
21. Parashara smriti
22. Prajapati smriti
23. Samvarta smriti
24. Shankha smriti
25. Shankha-Likhita smriti
26. Shatatapa smriti
27. Vasistha smriti
28. Vyasa smriti
29. Vishnu smriti
30. Vriddha Atreya smriti
31. Yajnavalkya smriti
32. Yama smriti

Dharmashastras whose existence is known through citations by commentators & nibandhakaras but didn't survive in complete manuscript form till now are

1. Budha smriti
2. Chhagaleya smriti
3. Cyavana smriti
4. Jamadagni smriti
5. Jabala smriti
6. Marichi smriti
7. Prachetas smriti
8. Pitamaha smriti
9. Paithinasi smriti
10. Rishyasringa smriti
11. Sumantu smriti
12. Shaunaka smriti
13. Vishwamitra smriti

===== Commentaries =====
Commentaries on the above-mentioned texts composed by erudite scholars discuss on their practical applications & execution of the statements in the dharmasutras & dharmashastras.

===== Nibandhas =====
Digests & compendiums composed by various scholars attempt to resolve difference of opinion on similar topics among the various texts & authors.

==== Regional variations ====
In the Collector of Madhura Vs Mottoo Ramalinga Sathupathy case (1869), the Privy Council observed that there was no uniformity in the observance of Hindu law (as described in the dharmashastras, commentaries & digests composed by various Hindu scholars) by Hindus throughout the realm. The court observed that

- On the basis of adherence to property law, Hindus are divided into 2 schools –
1. the Dayabhaga school, observed by Hindus in Bengal & Assam,
2. the Mitakshara school observed by all other Hindu communities of the Indian subcontinent.
- The Mitakshara school is subdivided into
1. The Benaras school which cites the Viramitrodaya of Mitra Mishra, Nirnayasindhu & Vivadatandava of Kamalakara Bhatta, Dattakamimasa of Nanda Pandita, Subodhini & Balambhatti commentaries of the Mitakshara as authority and is observed by Hindus of United Provinces, Central Provinces & Odisha.
2. The Mithila school which cites Vivadachintamani of Vachaspati Mishra, Vivadaratnakara of Chandeshvara Thakura, Vivadachandra of Misaru Mishra, Smrityarthasara of Sridhara & Madanaparijata of Vishveshvara Bhatta as authority & is observed by Hindus of Mithila
3. The Dravida school which cites Smritichandrika of Devanna Bhatta, Parasharamadhaviya (Madhavacharya's commentary on Parashara smriti), Sarasvativilasa of Prataparudra Deva, Viramitrodaya, Vyavaharanirnaya of Varadaraja, Dattakachandrika of Devanna Bhatta, Nirnayasindhu, Vivadatandava, Dayavibhaga of Kamalakara Bhatta & Keshavavaijayanti (Nanda Pandita's commentary on the Vishnu smriti) as authority & is observed by Hindus of Madras Presidency.
4. The Maratha School which cites Vyavaharamayukha of Nilakantha Bhatta, Smritikaustubha of Ananta Deva (grandson of Eknath), Viramitrodaya, Nirnayasindhu, Vivadatandava & Parasharamadhaviya as authority and is observed by Hindus of Bombay Presidency.
5. The Punjab school which cites Nirnayasindhu, Viramitrodaya & local customs (later documented as Riwaz-i-Aam) as authority and is observed by Hindus of Punjab. Kashmiri Hindus additionally cite the Apararkachandrika (commentary on the Yajnavalkya smriti by Aparaditya II, Silahara king of North Konkan)
- The Dayabhaga school cites Viramitrodaya & Dattakachandrika as authority. Bengali Hindus additionally cite the Smrititattva of Raghunandana & works of Bengali pandits like Halayudha, Bhavadeva Bhatta & Shulapani while Assamese Hindus cite the works of Pitambara Siddhantavagisha & other pandits from the Kamarupa like Damodara Mishra & Nilambaracharya

The Mitakshara school significantly differs from the Dayabhaga school in the following ways

- The Mitakshara doesn't allows partition of ancestral property among coparceners, while the Dayabhaga does.
- The Mitakshara completely bars women & their descendants from inheriting ancestral property (similar to Salic law), however the Dayabhaga allows childless widows to inherit property of their sonless fathers & childless husbands.
- According to Mitakshara, right of inheritance is vested by birth, hence the son is a coparcener to ancestral property from the day of his birth. However, in Dayabhaga, right of inheritance is vested by the right to offer pinda at sraddha ceremony, hence the son has no ownership on ancestral property during his father's lifetime.

=== Lawyers in classical Hindu Law ===
While texts on ancient Hindu law have not survived, texts that confirm the existence of the institution of lawyers in ancient India have. The Sanskrit text Vivadarnavasetu, in Chapter 3, for example, states,

If the plaintiff or defendant have any excuse for not attending the court, or for not pleading their own cause, or, on any other account, excuse themselves, they shall, at their own option, appoint a person as their lawyer; if the lawyer gains the suit, his principal also gains; if the lawyer is cast, his principal is cast also.

In a cause where the accusation is for murder, for a robbery, for adultery, for (...), the principals shall plead and answer in person; but a woman, a minor, an insane, or a person lacking mental competency may be represented by a lawyer.

— Vivadarnavasetu, Classical Hindu Law Process

=== Punishment in classical Hindu Law ===
Ancient texts of the Hindu tradition formulate and articulate punishment. These texts from the last 2500 years, states Terence Day, imply or recognize key elements in their theories of fair punishment: (1) the texts set a standard of Right, in order to define a violation that warrants punishment; (2) they discuss the possibility of a violation thereby defining a wrongdoing; (3) they discuss a theory of responsibility and assignability of a wrongdoing; (4) the texts discuss degrees of guilt, and therewith the form and severity of punishment must match the transgression; (5) they discuss approved and authorized forms of punishments and how these may be properly administered. The goal of punishment, in Hindu law, has been retributive and reformative. Hindu law, states Sarkar, developed the theory of punishment from its foundational theory of what it believed was necessary for the prosperity of the individual and a collection of individuals, of state and non-state.

There are wide variations in the statement of crime and associated punishment in different texts. Some texts for example discuss punishment for crimes such as murder, without mentioning the gender, class or caste of the plaintiff or defendant, while some discuss and differentiate the crime based on gender, class or caste. It is unclear, states Terence Day, whether these were part of the original, because the stylistic, structural and substantive evidence such as inconsistencies between versions of different manuscripts of the same text suggest changes and corruption of the original texts.

=== Outside India ===
Ancient Hindu legal texts and traditions arrived in parts of Southeast Asia (Cambodia, Java, Bali, Malaysia, Thailand, and Burma) as trade grew and as part of a larger culture sharing in ancient Asia. In each of these regions, Hindu law fused with local norms and practices, giving rise to legal texts (Āgamas such as the Kuṭāra-Mānawa in Java, and the Buddhist-influenced Dhammasattas/Dhammathats of Burma, such as the Wareru Dhammathat, and Thailand) as well as legal records embodied (as in India) in stone and copper-plate inscriptions.

== Anglo-Hindu law ==
As East India Company obtained political and administrative powers, in parts of India, in the late 18th century, it was faced with various state responsibilities such as legislative and judiciary functions. The East India Company desired a means to establish and maintain the rule of law, and property rights, in a stable political environment, to expedite trade, and with minimal expensive military engagement. To this end the Company pursued a path of least resistance, relying upon local intermediaries that were mostly Muslims and some Hindus in various Indian states. The British exercised power by avoiding interference and adapting to local law practices, as explained by the local intermediaries. The colonial state thus sustained what were essentially pre-colonial religious and political law and conflicts, well into the late nineteenth century. The colonial policy on the system of personal laws for India, for example, was expressed by Governor-General Hastings in 1772 as follows,

That in all suits regarding inheritance, marriage, caste and other religious usages or institutions, the law of the Koran with respect to Mahometans, and those of the Shaster with respect to Gentoos shall be invariably be adhered to.

— Warren Hastings, 15 August 1772

For Muslims of India, the code of Muslim law was readily available in al-Hidaya and Fatawa 'Alamgiri (written under sponsorship of Aurangzeb). For Hindus and other non-Muslims such as Buddhists, Sikhs, Jains, Parsis and Tribal people, this information was unavailable. The British colonial officials, for practice, attempted to extract from the Dharmaśāstra the English categories of law and religion for the purposes of colonial administration.

The early period of Anglo-Hindu Law (1772–1828) was structured along the lines of Muslim law practice. It included the extracted portions of law from a single Dharmaśāstra text (Manusmrti with the commentary of the Bengali Hindu scholar Kulluka Bhatta) translated into English by British colonial government appointed scholars (especially William Jones, Henry Thomas Colebrooke, J. C. C. Sutherland and Harry Borrodaile) in a manner similar to Islamic al-Hidaya and Fatawa-i Alamgiri. It also included the use of court pandits in British courts to aid British judges in interpreting Shastras just like Qadis for interpreting the Islamic law. The Calcutta Sanskrit College was established to train court pandits, the Calcutta Madrassah to train court qadis & Fort William College to train the British judges in Indian law.

The arrival of William Bentinck as the Governor-General of British India in 1828, marked a shift towards universal civil code, whose administration emphasized same law for all human beings, individualism and equal treatment to help liberate, empower and end social practices among Hindus and Muslims of India that had received much negative public coverage in Britain through the Otientalist publications of Christian missionaries and individuals such as Thomas Macaulay.The resulting codification of Hindu law by the British authorities in their attempt to create a homogeneous, uniform and consistent legal corpus was characterised by increasing importance of the authority of 'canonical' scripture over tradition (derived from secondary texts like commentaries and digests) and unrecorded customary law in vogue amongst various groups, in accordance to the sola scriptura doctrine

Governor-General Dalhousie, in 1848, extended this trend and stated his policy that the law must "treat all natives much the same manner". Over time, between 1828 and 1855, a series of British parliamentary acts were passed to revise the Anglo-Hindu and Anglo-Muslim laws, such as those relating to the right to religious conversion, widow remarriage, and right to create wills for inheritance. In 1832, the British colonial government abolished accepting religious fatwa as a source of law. In 1835, the British began creating a new criminal code that would replace the existing criminal code which was a complex conflicting mixture of laws derived from Muslim texts (Sharia) and Hindu texts (Shastras), and this common criminal code was ready by 1855. These changes were welcomed by Hindu reform movement, but considered abrogating religion-defined rules within the Muslim law. The changes triggered discontent, call for jihad and religious war, and became partly responsible for the 1857 Indian revolt resulting from what was perceived in the common mind as an insult to the inherent hegemony of Indian people of self rule against the British intervention.

In 1864, after the East India Company was dissolved and India became a formal part of the British Empire, Anglo-Hindu law entered into a second phase (1864–1947), one in which British colonial courts in India no longer relied on the Muslim Qadis and Hindu Pandits for determining the respective religious laws, and relied more on a written law. A universal criminal code in India, that did not discriminate between people based on their religion, was adopted for the first time in 1864. It was expanded to include a universal procedural and commercial code by 1882, which overruled pre-existing Anglo-Hindu and Anglo-Muslim laws. However, the personal laws for Muslims remained sharia-based, while the Anglo-Hindu law was enacted independent of Hindu shastras on matters such as marriage, divorce, inheritance and the Anglo-Hindu law covered all Hindus, Jains, Sikhs and Buddhists in India. In 1872, the British crown enacted the Indian Christian Marriage Act, 1872 which covered marriage, divorce and alimony laws for Indian Christians of all denominations except the Roman Catholics.

The development of legal pluralism, that is separate law based on individual's religion, was controversial in India from the very start.

Legislation introduced by the British Government was a powerful tool in implementing reforms within the Hindu society. Some important legislations were:

1. Ban on the practice of sati in Hindu society
2. Legal recognition to remarriage of Hindu widows and a childless widow's right to inherit her deceased husband's property
3. Abolition of slavery in Hindu society by the Indian Penal Code in 1861
4. Legal recognition to dissolution of a Hindu marriage in case of the husband converting to Christianity or Islam by the Native Converts' Marriage Dissolution Act, 1866
5. Ban on the practice of female infanticide observed by certain Hindu communities in northern India
6. Introduction of the concept of 'age of consent' in Hindu society & criminalizing consummation of child-marriages
7. Legal recognition to right of a Hindu man to pass down his property to anybody via legal declaration (last will) apart from the heirs identified in religious laws (like children and relatives) by the Indian Succession Act, 1925.
8. Legal recognition to the right of a diseased/handicapped Hindu to inherit property
9. Legal abolition of child-marriage in Hindu society
10. Legal recognition to the right of Dalits for entering Hindu temples by the Madras Temple Entry Authorisation and Indemnity Act, 1939
11. Legal recognition to the right of a Hindu married woman to live apart from her husband by the Hindu Married Women's Right to Separate Residence and Maintenance Act, 1944
12. Legal abolition of bigamy in Hindu society by the Bombay (Prevention of Hindu Bigamy) Marriage Act, 1946

These laws had generated widespread protests and condemnation from the orthodox elements of the Hindu society. The British government failed to strictly implement laws against child-marriages and consummation of child marriages due to fears of the Hindu society rising up in open revolt against them.

== Modern Hindu law ==
After the independence of India from the colonial rule of Britain in 1947, India adopted a new constitution in 1950. Most of the legal code from the colonial era continued as the law of the new nation, including the personal laws contained in Anglo-Hindu law for Hindus, Buddhists, Jains and Sikhs, the Anglo-Christian law for Christians, and the Anglo-Muslim law for Muslims. Article 44 of the 1950 Indian constitution mandates a uniform civil code, eliminating all religion-based civil laws including Hindu law, Christian law and Muslim law throughout the territory of India. While Hindu law has since been amended to be independent of ancient religious texts, Article 44 of the Indian constitution has remained largely ignored in matters of Muslim law by successive Indian governments since 1950.

An amendment to the constitution (42nd Amendment, 1976) formally inserted the word secular as a feature of the Indian republic. However, unlike the Western concept of secularism which separates religion and state, the concept of secularism in India means acceptance of religious laws as binding on the state, and equal participation of state in different religions.

Since the early 1950s, India has debated whether legal pluralism should be replaced with legal universalism and a uniform civil code that does not differentiate between people based on their religion. This debate remains unresolved. The Quran-based Indian Muslim Personal Law (Shariat) Application Act, 1937 remained the law of the land of modern India for Indian Muslims, whereas secular personal laws promulgated by the Indian Parliament (at the behest of the Law Minister Dr. B. R. Ambedkar) without any reference from Hindu religious texts and solely modelled on their Western European counterparts based on concepts of equality and non-discrimination enshrined in the Constitution passed in the mid-1950s was applied to Indians who are Hindus (along with Buddhists, Jains, Sikhs and Parsees), as well as to Indian Christians and Jews. This has been a source of controversy in Indian political circles, with the Hindu right-wing describing the existence of a separate body of religious law for Muslims while denying the same to non-Muslims as a form of Muslim appeasement. They demand that under a uniform civil code, Muslims should be made to follow the same family law as Hindus.

Legislation introduced by the Government of India continued to be a tool for inducing reforms within the Hindu society. Some important legislations were

1. Legal abolition of caste and sex-based discrimination by Article 15 of the Constitution of India
2. Legal abolition of untouchability by Article 17 of the Constitution of India
3. Legal recognition to civil marriage in Hindu society and inter-faith marriage in India
4. Legal recognition to inter-caste marriage, abolition of polygamy and introduction of the concept of divorce in Hindu society
5. Mandatory enforcement of the protection of civil rights of SC and ST people by the Untouchability (Offenses) Act, 1955
6. Legal recognition to Hindu women as legal guardians of their children
7. Legal recognition to adoption of Hindu children outside the family, community and caste of the adopter
8. Legal recognition to the right of Hindu women for inheriting paternal property and that of all Hindus to inherit property matrilineally
9. Criminalisation of hate-crimes against SC and ST people
10. Legal abolition of the practice of a Hindu's obligation to repay ancestral debt and recognition to equal rights of both sons and daughters for inheriting ancestral property
11. Legal recognition to right of all Hindus irrespective of sex and caste to receive compulsory education

Acceptance to overseas travelling (see Kalapani) was a reformation within the Hindu society implemented without enacting any legislature.

The Hindu code bills (stated under nos. 4, 6, 7 and 8) were met with severe criticism & condemnation by Hindu right-wing outfits. In spite of the passage of new laws, child marriage continues to be in vogue among Hindus, especially in rural areas. Calls have also been made to free Hindu temples from government control.

== See also ==
- Classical Hindu law
- Comparative law
- Dhammasattha
- Dharma
- Dharmasastra
- Divine law
- Henry Thomas Colebrooke
- Jīmūtavāhana
- List of Hindu empires and dynasties
- Religious law
- Robert Lingat
- Sharia
- Traditional Chinese law
- Wareru Dhammathat
