= Mitākṣarā =

Ancient Indian legal commentary

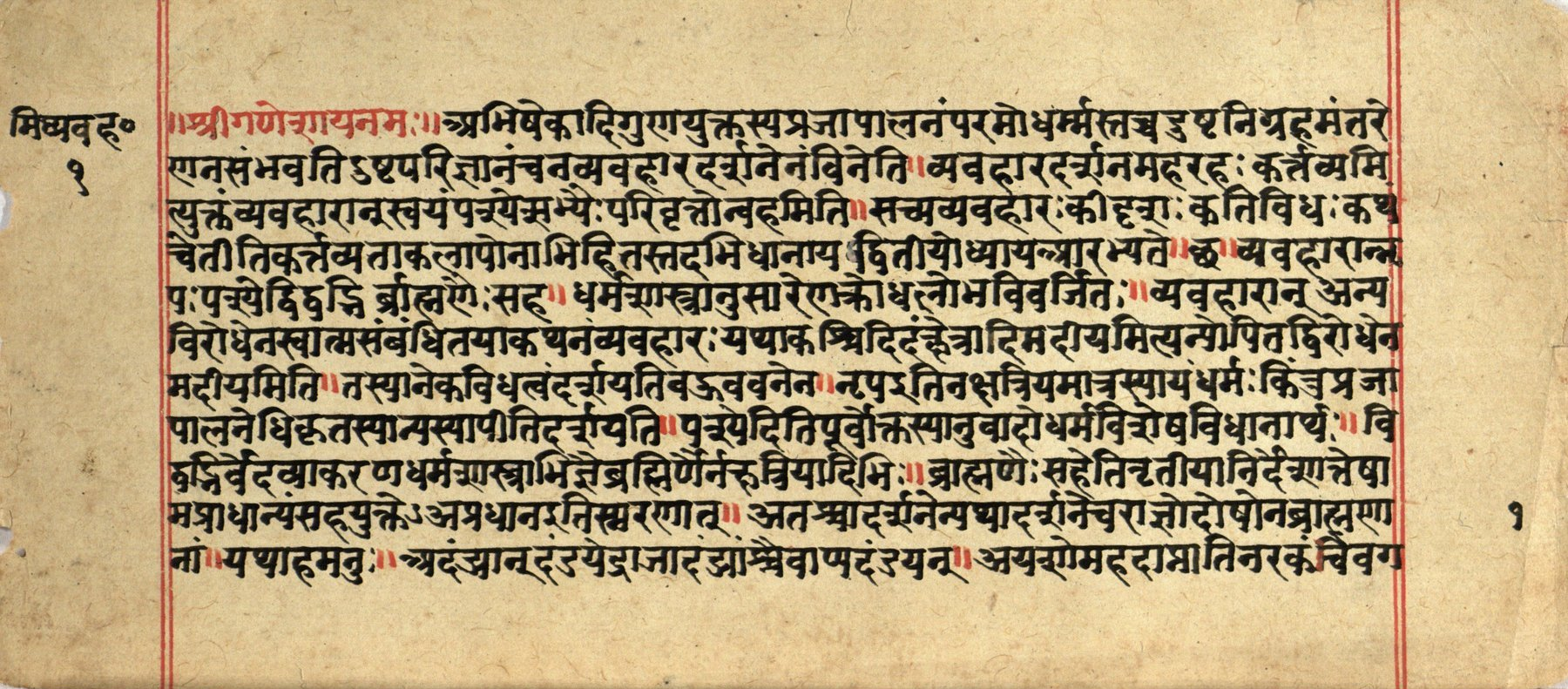
Manuscript of the Mitākṣarā, c. 18th century CE

The Mitākṣarā is a vivṛti (legal commentary) on the Yajnavalkya Smriti best known for its theory of "inheritance by birth." It was written by Vijñāneśvara, a scholar in the Kalyani Chalukya court in the late eleventh century in the modern day state of Karnataka. Along with the Dāyabhāga, it was considered one of the main authorities on Hindu Law from the time the British began administering laws in India. The entire Mitākṣarā, along with the text of the Yājñavalkya-smṝti, is approximately 492 closely printed pages.

== Author ==
Vijñāneśvara lived at Marthur near Kalaburagi (in the modern-day state of Karnataka), near the end of the eleventh century during the reign of Vikramaditya VI of the Cālukya dynasty of Kalyāni, one of the great rulers of the Deccan. He was a "profound student of the Mimamsa system," a system of exegetical thought focused on the interpretation of the Vedas. Contrary to Derrett's opinion based on Yajnavalkya 2.4 and 2.305 that Vijñāneśvara was a judge, Kane holds that these passages about characteristics of judges do not reflect a social or historical reality, but rather an interpretation based upon Mimamsa.

== Date and historical context ==
Kane places the Mitākṣarā between 974 CE and 1000 CE, but he says, "there is no evidence to establish the exact time when the work was undertaken." He places it after 1050 CE because it names Viśvarūpa, Medhātithi, and Dhāreśvara, other commentators, as authoritative sources. Derrett places the text between 1121 CE and 1125 CE, a much shorter time frame than Kane, but Kane claims that this time frame is purely arbitrary, and Derrett does not provide the evidence to support his claim. Lingat, however, is content to place the Mitākṣarā simply at the end of the eleventh century. Historically, Vijñāneśvara was attempting to clarify and explain parts of the Yājñavalkya Smṛti, and he was criticizing and discussing earlier commentaries on the same text in an attempt to reconcile differences and further explain the meaning and the significance of the text.

== Sources and topics ==
Vijñāneśvara's commentary "brings together numerous smṛti passages, explains away contradictions among them by following the rules of interpretation laid down in the Mimamsa system, brings about order by assigning to various dicta their proper scope and province...and effects a synthesis of apparently unconnected smṛti injunctions." In this sense, the commentary is similar to a digest (nibandha) in that it attempts to draw into the commentary outside opinions about the same passages of the text which he is commenting on. Although he is commenting on the Yājñavalkya Smṛti, he cites numerous earlier commentators as well, including Viśvarūpa, Mēdhātithi, and Dhāreśvara. The Mitākṣarā's most important topics include property rights, property distribution, and inheritance. This text has become the authority, especially on inheritance, throughout most of India after the British began to move in.

== Effect on British India ==
The Mitākṣarā, along with the Dāyabhāga, became an influential source for British Courts in India. The Mitākṣarā was influential throughout the majority of India, except in Bengal, Assam and some of the parts in Odisha and Bihar, where the Dāyabhāga prevailed as an authority for law. The British were interested in administering law in India, but they wanted to administer the law that already existed to the people. Thus, they searched for a text that could be used to help solve disputes among the people of India in manners which were already customary in the sub continent. These disputes often involved property rights or inheritance issues. Thus, the first translation of the Mitākṣarā was by Colebrooke in 1810, and it was only this section of the text that gave the British insight on how to deal with inheritance issues. At that point, the Mitākṣarā held the status of a legislative text because it was used as a direct resource regarding inheritance in the courts of law in most of India.

== Translations ==
Colebrooke did the first translation of the Mitākṣarā in 1810 because there was an immediate need in the British courts for the "law" (or as close as they could get to the law) regarding inheritance that already existed among the people of India. W. Macnaghten did the second translation, dealing with procedure, in 1829. Finally, J. R. Gharpure provided us with a complete translation of the Mitākṣarā.

== Sub-commentaries ==
Several sub-commentaries have been written on the Mitākṣarā, including the Subodhinī of Viśveśvara (c.1375), the Bālaṃbhaṭṭī of Bālaṃbhaṭṭa Payagunde (c.1770). and the Pratītākṣarā of Nandapaṇḍita. The Bālaṃbhaṭṭī is notable for having greatly informed Colebrooke's translation of the Mitākṣarā, and also for possibly having been written by a woman, Lakṣmīdevī.

The 13th-century Telugu language text Vijnaneshvaramu is based on Mitākṣarā.
