= Pandurang Vaman Kane =

Indian indologist and scholar (1880–1972)

Mahamahopadhyaya Pandurang Vaman Kane MP
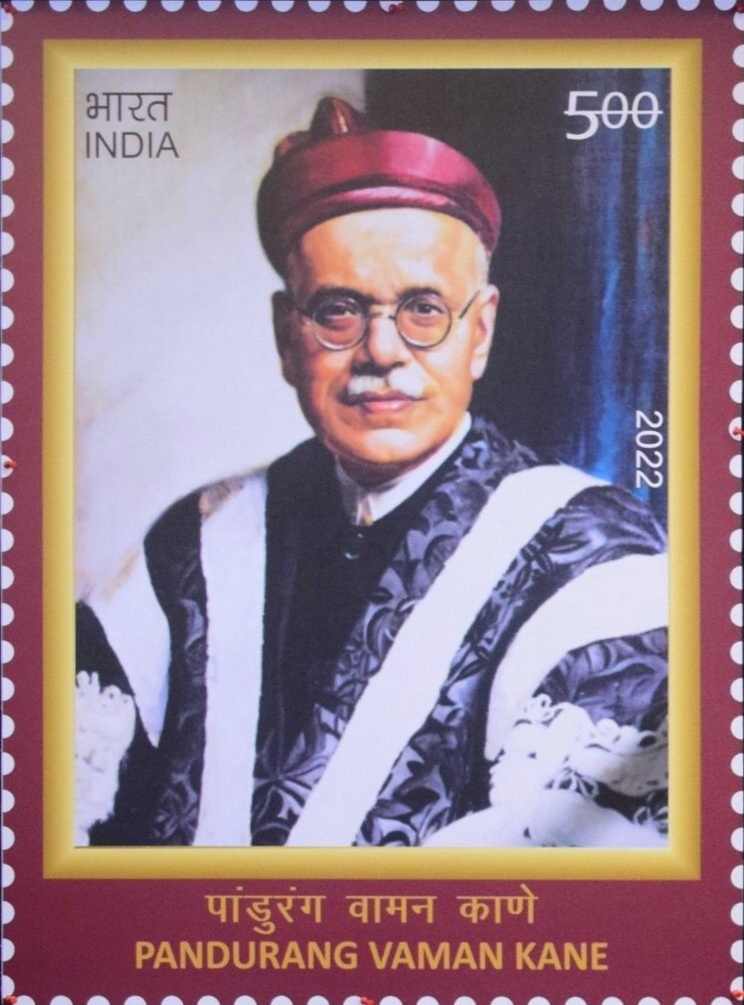

Member of Parliament, Rajya Sabha (Nominated)
- In office 16 November 1953 – 2 April 1964
- Preceded by: Alladi Krishnaswamy Iyer
- Constituency: Presidential Nominee

Vice Chancellor of the University of Bombay
- In office 10 November 1947 – 9 November 1949
- Preceded by: M. C. Chagla
- Succeeded by: Natwarlal H. Bhagwati

Personal details
- Born: 7 May 1880 Ratnagiri district, Maharashtra
- Died: 18 April 1972 (aged 91)
- Education: University of Mumbai
- Awards: Sahitya Akademi Award (1956); Bharat Ratna (1963)

Pandurang Vaman Kane (kɑːnɛ KAANAY; 7 May 1880 – 18 April 1972) was an Indian academic, historian, lawyer, Indologist, and Sanskrit scholar. He was awarded the Bharat Ratna, India's highest civilian award in 1963.

Kane's academic career spanned more than four decades, and included a tenure as the vice-chancellor of the University of Bombay, from 1947 to 1949. He is known for his magnum opus, History of Dharmaśāstra (1930–62), a five-volume treatise on law in ancient and medieval India. He was nominated to the Rajya Sabha, upper house of the Indian parliament from 1953 to 1964.

Kane initially studied and taught Sanskrit, but later obtained degrees in law and practiced before the Bombay High Court. He taught Sanskrit at Wilson College and Elphinstone College and law at Government Law College. Kane was a member of the Bombay Asiatic Society.

The historian Ram Sharan Sharma says: "Pandurang Vaman Kane, a great Sanskritist wedded to social reform, continued the earlier tradition of scholarship. His monumental work entitled the "History of the Dharmasastra", published in five volumes in the twentieth century, is an encyclopedia of ancient social laws and customs. This enables us to study the social processes in ancient India."

== Early life ==
Kane was born on 7 May 1880 at Pedem (or Parasurama), near Chiplun, Ratnagiri district, Bombay Presidency. His paternal family belonged to a priestly caste, however, his father, Vamanrao Kane, was a pleader and a taluka lawyer. His father taught him astrology and Sanskrit, instructing him to memorise Amarakosa, a Sanskrit thesaurus. He attended school and passed his matriculation examinations at A.G.Highschool Dapoli.

Kane attended Wilson College, graduating with a B. A. degree in 1901, and was awarded the Bhau Daji Lad Prize in Sanskrit. He continued studying Sanskrit at Wilson College, obtaining a M. A. in English and Sanksrit by 1903. Later, he studied law. He briefly taught as a school teacher at Government High School, Ratnagiri and Elphinstone High School, Bombay. In 1909, he was appointed professor of Sanskrit at Elphinstone College. After that, he enrolled as an advocate in Bombay High Court.

== Career ==
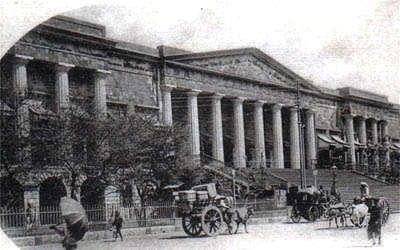
The town hall of the Asiatic Society of Mumbai, whose resources Kane researched; Later, the Asiatic Society commemorated him with an institute in his name

Kane is best known for his History of Dharmaśāstra, a five-volume treatise on law in ancient and medieval India. Dharmaśāstra is a group of Sanskrit texts on law and conduct. Kane's treatise is an English digest of the Dharmaśāstra.

The first volume of the History of Dharmaśāstra was completed by Kane and published by the Bhandarkar Oriental Research Institute, Pune in 1930. The final volume, namely the fifth volume of the treatise, was published in two parts, with the second part being published in 1962. The whole treatise encompasses 6,500 pages, and provides an authoritative and encyclopedic treatment of the religious and civil law of ancient and medieval India.

Kane wrote the book Vyavaharamayukha and was in the process of writing an introductory passage on the History of Dharmaśāstra for this book so that the reader would get an overall idea apart from the subject of the book. One thing led to another and this project snowballed into the major work that it is. All the same, he was categorical in saying that it is difficult to find an English equivalent of the word "Dharma." His output in the form of writings across the three languages of English, Sanskrit and Marathi spans nearly 15,000 pages.

History of Poetics was one of his other great books. Apart from Theology and Poetry, he wrote a great deal on other topics too, which included Astrology, Cultural and Geographical history of India-Maharashtra-Konkan- Vidarbha, Marathi language, its grammar, language & handwriting, economics of Kautilya (Chanakya), Mathematics, Dramatics, etc. There are in all 198 publications by his name. They include 39 texts, 115 articles, 44 books, introductions and reviews.

== Recognition ==
Dr. Kane was rewarded as Mahamahopadhyaya (Etymology: Maha+Maha+Upadhyay = The greatest among the great teachers), usually shortened to MM as a prefix in the writings that refer to him. He served as the vice-chancellor of the University of Mumbai. His services were requisitioned and enlisted for establishing Kurukshetra University in Indic studies. He was awarded the Sahitya Akademi award in 1956 for History of Dharmaśāstra, vol. IV for his research under the Sanskrit translation category. He was also an honorary member of the Bharatiya Vidya Bhavan.

He was nominated to the Rajya Sabha as a member of Parliament for his distinguished record in the field of academics. The highest accolade bestowed upon him was the Bharat Ratna in 1963.

The Asiatic Society of Mumbai sponsored a stamp in his honour, which was released by the governor of Maharashtra on 18 April 2022.

== Indian law ==
Kane believed that the Constitution of India made a complete break with the traditional ideas prevalent in India by engendering a false notion among the people that they have rights but no obligations.

Given the encyclopaedic and authoritative nature of his work, it is often used in debates in Polity. One such issue that cropped up during Atal Bihari Vajpayee government was whether ancient Indians ate beef and both the groups quoted extensively from Kane's work to support their viewpoint. This issue became important as Hindus traditionally revere the cow as a mother and hence eating of beef is prohibited. Another such issue was whether the girls in the ancient times had the right to wear the yajnopavita (sacred thread), as the upanayana ceremony was restricted only to the men in the recent past.

== Legacy ==
To commemorate him, the Asiatic Society of Mumbai has established the Mm. Dr. P.V. Kane Institute for Post Graduate studies and Research in 1974 to promote, encourage and facilitate research in oriental studies. Also, MM Dr. P.V. Kane Gold Medal is given once every three years to a scholar for outstanding contribution to the study of Vedic, Dharmashastra or Alankara Literature.

== See also ==
- Dharmasastra
- Dharma

== Other sources ==
- S.G. Moghe (editor), Professor Kane's contribution to Dharmasastra literature, 1997, New Delhi: D.K. Printworld (P) Ltd. ISBN 81-246-0075-9
- Autobiographical Epilogue in History of Dharmashastra Vol 5
