= Hinduism =

Range of Indian religious traditions

Hinduism (/ˈhɪn.du.ɪz.əm/ HIN-doo-iz-əm) is an umbrella term (Note: Smith (1963, pp. 65–66): "My point, and I think that this is the first step that one must take towards understanding something of the vision of Hindus, is that the mass of religious phenomena that we shelter under the umbrella of that term, is not a unity and does not aspire to be." Brodd et al. (2018, p. 92): "Hinduism has neither a single founder nor a single sacred book. There is no single historical event that marks its birth. The history of Hinduism embodies both continuity and change. Having never had a sole central authority, Hinduism's fluid character has always allowed it to adapt to a variety of social and cultural contexts. This diversity has led many scholars to argue that Hinduism is not one religion at all but a constellation of many religious sects that share some common aspects. Others see enough by way of common beliefs and practices to regard Hinduism as a single religious tradition.") for a range of Indian religious and spiritual traditions (sampradayas) (Note: Hinduism is variously defined as a "religion", "set of religious beliefs and practices", "religious tradition", "way of life" (Sharma 2003, pp. 12–13), etc. For a discussion on the topic, see: "Establishing the boundaries" in Flood 2003, pp. 1–17.) that are unified by adherence to Dharma, a cosmic order maintained by its followers through rituals and righteous living, (Note: There is no single-word translation for dharma in Western languages (Widgery 1930, Rocher 2003). The Oxford Dictionary of World Religions, Dharma, defines dharma as follows: "the order and custom which make life and a universe possible, and thus to the behaviours appropriate to the maintenance of that order." See Dharma (righteousness, ethics). 'Hindu dharma' refers to the religious behaviours and attitudes of the various traditions collectively referred to as Hinduism: Thomas (2012, p. 175): "Some 'Hindus' refer to this agglomeration of religious forms as 'Hindu dharma' (dharma here standing loosely for' religion'), but that is only to enable them to communicate to westerners some of their own religious attitudes."; Bhattacharya (2006, p. 1): "Dharma, therefore, is just not a belief but righteous living.") as expounded in the Vedas. (Note: Flood (2003a, p. 4): "This revelation of the Veda[s], verses believed to have been revealed to and heard by (sruti) the ancient sages (rsi), as symbol and legitimizing reference if not actual text, is central as a constraining influence on later traditions, providing the authority for tradition (Oberhammer 1997: 21–31). Some would argue that this is a defining feature of Hinduism.) The word Hindu originated as an exonym, (Note: There are several views on the earliest mention of 'Hindu' in the context of religion: Flood 1996, p. 6 states: "In Arabic texts, Al-Hind is a term used for the people of modern-day India and 'Hindu', or 'Hindoo', was used towards the end of the eighteenth century by the British to refer to the people of 'Hindustan', the people of northwest India. Eventually 'Hindu' became virtually equivalent to an 'Indian' who was not a Muslim, Sikh, Jain, or Christian, thereby encompassing a range of religious beliefs and practices. The '-ism' was added to Hindu in around 1830 to denote the culture and religion of the high-caste Brahmans in contrast to other religions, and the term was soon appropriated by Indians themselves in the context of building a national identity opposed to colonialism, though the term 'Hindu' was used in Sanskrit and Bengali hagiographic texts in contrast to 'Yavana' or Muslim as early as the sixteenth century."; Sharma 2002 and other scholars state that the 7th-century Chinese scholar Xuanzang, whose 17-year travel to India and interactions with its people and religions were recorded and preserved in the Chinese language, uses the transliterated term In-tu whose "connotation overflows in the religious".(Sharma 2002) Xuanzang describes Hindu Deva-temples of the early 7th century CE, worship of Sun deity and Shiva, his debates with scholars of Samkhya and Vaisheshika schools of Hindu philosophies, monks and monasteries of Hindus, Jains and Buddhists (both Mahayana and Theravada), and the study of the Vedas along with Buddhist texts at Nalanda. See also Gosch & Stearns 2007, pp. 88–99, Sharma 2011, pp. 5–12, Smith et al. 2012, pp. 321–324.; Sharma 2002 also mentions the use of the word Hindu in Islamic texts such as those relating to the 8th-century Arab invasion of Sindh by Muhammad ibn Qasim, Al Biruni's 11th-century text Tarikh Al-Hind, and those of the Delhi Sultanate period, where the term Hindu retains the ambiguities of including all non-Islamic people such as Buddhists and of being "a region or a religion".; Lorenzen 2006 states, citing Richard Eaton: "one of the earliest occurrences of the word 'Hindu' in Islamic literature appears in 'Abd al-Malik Isami's Persian work, Futuhu's-Salatin, composed in the Deccan in 1350. In this text, 'Isami uses the word 'hindi' to mean Indian in the ethno-geographical sense and the word 'hindu' to mean 'Hindu' in the sense of a follower of the Hindu religion".(Lorenzen 2006, p. 33); Lorenzen 2006, pp. 32–33 also mentions other non-Persian texts such as Prithvíráj Ráso by ~12th century Canda Baradai, and epigraphical inscription evidence from Andhra Pradesh kingdoms who battled military expansion of Muslim dynasties in the 14th century, where the word 'Hindu' partly implies a religious identity in contrast to 'Turks' or Islamic religious identity.; Lorenzen 2006, p. 15 states that one of the earliest uses of word 'Hindu' in religious context, in a European language (Spanish), was the publication in 1649 by Sebastiao Manrique.) and while Hinduism has been called the oldest surviving religion in the world, (Note: See: Fowler 1997, p. 1: "probably the oldest religion in the world."; Klostermaier 2007, p. 1: The "oldest living major religion" in the world.; Kurien 2006: "There are almost a billion Hindus living on Earth. They practice the world's oldest religion..."; Bakker 1997: "it [Hinduism] is the oldest religion".; Noble 1998: "Hinduism, the world's oldest surviving religion, continues to provide the framework for daily life in much of South Asia."; Smart 1993, p. 1, on the other hand, calls it also one of the youngest religions: "Hinduism could be seen to be much more recent, though with various ancient roots: in a sense it was formed in the late 19th Century and early 20th Century." Animism has also been called "the oldest religion."(Sponsel 2012: "Animism is by far the oldest religion in the world. Its antiquity seems to go back at least as far as the period of the Neanderthals some 60,000 to 80,000 years ago.") Australian linguist, R. M. W. Dixon discovered that Aboriginal myths regarding the origin of the Crater Lakes might be dated as accurate back to 10,000 years ago (Dixon 1996). David et al. (2024) found archaeological evidence that the mulla-mullung ritual, described in the 19th century, dates back at least 12,000 years. See also: Urreligion, shamanism, animism, ancestor worship for some of the oldest forms of religion; Indian tribal religions such as Sarnaism, Sari Dharam, Donyi-Polo and Sanamahism, connected to the earliest migrations into India) it is also described since the 19th century by the term Sanātana Dharma (lit. 'eternal dharma'). (Note: Sanatāna Dharma: Harvey 2001, p. xiii: "In modern Indian usage, sanātana dharma is often equated with 'Hinduism' as a name, stressing the eternal foundation of it."; Knott 1998, p. 5: "Many describe Hinduism as sanatana dharma, the eternal tradition or religion. This refers to the idea that its origins lie beyond human history."; Knott 1998, p. 117: " The phrase sanatana dharma, eternal tradition, used often by Hindus to describe their religion, implies antiquity, but its usage is modern."; Parpola 2015, p. 3: "Some Indians object to having a foreign term for their religion, preferring the Sanskrit expression sanātana dharma, "eternal law or truth," despite the fact that this expression was not applied to any religious system in ancient texts.") Vaidika Dharma (lit. 'Vedic dharma') and Arya Dharma are historical endonyms for Hinduism.

Hinduism encompasses diverse systems of thought, marked by a range of shared concepts that discuss theology, mythology, and other topics in textual sources. Hindu texts have been classified into Śruti (lit. 'heard') and Smṛti (lit. 'remembered'). The major Hindu scriptures are the Vedas, the Upanishads, the Puranas, the Ramayana, the Mahabharata (including the Bhagavad Gita), and the Agamas. Prominent themes in Hindu beliefs include karma (action, intent and consequences), saṃsāra (the cycle of death and rebirth) and the four Puruṣārthas, proper goals or aims of human life, namely: dharma (ethics/duties), artha (prosperity/work), kama (desires/passions) and moksha (liberation/emancipation from passions and ultimately saṃsāra). Hindu religious practices include devotion (bhakti), worship (puja), sacrificial rites (yajna), meditation (dhyana), and Yoga. Hinduism has no central doctrinal authority and many Hindus do not claim to belong to any denomination. However, scholarly studies recognise four major denominations: Vaishnavism, Shaivism, Shaktism, and Smartism. The six Āstika schools of Hindu philosophy that recognise the authority of the Vedas are: Sankhya, Yoga, Nyaya, Vaisheshika, Mīmāṃsā, and Vedanta.

While the traditional Itihasa-Purana and its derived Epic-Puranic chronology present Hinduism as a tradition existing for thousands of years, scholars regard Hinduism as a fusion (Note: Lockard 2007, p. 50: "The encounters that resulted from Aryan migration brought together several very different peoples and cultures, reconfiguring Indian society. Over many centuries a fusion of Aryan and Dravidian occurred, a complex process that historians have labeled the Indo-Aryan synthesis." Lockard 2007, p. 52: "Hinduism can be seen historically as a synthesis of Aryan beliefs with Harappan and other Dravidian traditions that developed over many centuries.") or synthesis (Note: Hiltebeitel 2002, p. 12: "A period of consolidation, sometimes identified as one of 'Hindu synthesis', 'Brahmanic synthesis', or 'orthodox synthesis', takes place between the time of the late Vedic Upanishads (c. 500 BCE) and the period of Gupta imperial ascendency (c. 320–467 CE).") of Brahmanical orthopraxy (Note: See: Samuel 2008, p. 194: "The Brahmanical pattern"; Flood 1996, p. 16: "The tradition of brahmanical orthopraxy has played the role of 'master narrative'"; Hiltebeitel 2002, p. 12: "Brahmanical synthesis"; According to Heesterman 2005, Brahmanism developed out of the Historical Vedic religion; "It is loosely known as Brahmanism because of the religious and legal importance it places on the brāhmaṇa (priestly) class of society." According to Witzel 1995, this development started around 1000 BCE in the Kuru kingdom, with the Brahmins providing elaborate rituals to enhance the status of the Kuru kings.) with various Indian cultures, (Note: See also: Ghurye 1980, pp. 3–4: "He [J. H. Hutton, the Commissioner of the Census of 1931] considers modern Hinduism to be the result of an amalgam between pre-Aryan Indian beliefs of Mediterranean inspiration and the religion of the Rigveda. 'The Tribal religions present, as it were, surplus material not yet built into the temple of Hinduism'."; Zimmer 1951, pp. 218–219.; Sjoberg 1990, p. 43. Quote: [Tyler (1973). India: An Anthropological Perspective. p. 68.]; "The Hindu synthesis was less the dialectical reduction of orthodoxy and heterodoxy than the resurgence of the ancient, aboriginal Indus civilization. In this process the rude, barbaric Aryan tribes were gradually civilised and eventually merged with the autochthonous Dravidians. Although elements of their domestic cult and ritualism were jealously preserved by Brahman priests, the body of their culture survived only in fragmentary tales and allegories embedded in vast, syncretistic compendia. On the whole, the Aryan contribution to Indian culture is insignificant. The essential pattern of Indian culture was already established in the third millennium B.C., and ... the form of Indian civilization perdured and eventually reasserted itself."; Sjoberg 1990.; Flood 1996, p. 16: "Contemporary Hinduism cannot be traced to a common origin [...] The many traditions which feed into contemporary Hinduism can be subsumed under three broad headings: the tradition of Brahmanical orthopraxy, the renouncer traditions and popular or local traditions. The tradition of Brahmanical orthopraxy has played the role of 'master narrative', transmitting a body of knowledge and behaviour through time, and defining the conditions of orthopraxy, such as adherence to varnasramadharma."; Nath 2001.; Werner 1998.; Werner 2005, pp. 8–9.; Lockard 2007, p. 50.; Hiltebeitel 2002.; Hopfe & Woodward 2008, p. 79: "The religion that the Aryans brought with them mingled with the religion of the native people, and the culture that developed between them became classical Hinduism."; Samuel 2010.) having diverse roots (Note: Among its roots are the Vedic religion of the late Vedic period (Flood 1996, p. 16) and its emphasis on the status of Brahmans (Samuel 2008, pp. 48–53), but also the religions of the Indus Valley civilisation (Narayanan 2009, p. 11; Lockard 2007, p. 52; Hiltebeitel 2002, p. 3; Jones & Ryan 2007, p. xviii) the śramaṇa or renouncer traditions of northeastern India (Flood 1996, p. 16; Gomez 2013, p. 42), with possible roots in a non-Vedic Indo-Aryan culture (Bronkhorst 2007); and "popular or local traditions" (Flood 1996, p. 16) and prehistoric cultures "that thrived in South Asia long before the creation of textual evidence that we can decipher with any confidence."Doniger 2010, p. 66)) and no specific founder. This Hindu synthesis emerged after the Vedic period, between c. 500 to 200 BCE, and c. 300 CE, in the period of the second urbanisation and the early classical period of Hinduism when the epics and the first Purānas were composed. It flourished in the medieval period, with the decline of Buddhism in India. Since the 19th century, modern Hinduism, influenced by Western culture, has acquired a great appeal in the West, notably reflected in the popularisation of Yoga and various sects such as Transcendental Meditation and ISKCON, better known as the Hare Krishna movement.

Hinduism is the world's third-largest religion and considered the largest ethnic religion, with approximately 1.17 billion followers, or around 15% of the global population, known as Hindus, largely in India, Nepal, Mauritius, and in Bali, Indonesia. Significant numbers of Hindu communities are found in the countries of South Asia, in Southeast Asia, in the Caribbean, Middle East, North America, Europe, Oceania, Africa, and Australia.

== Etymology ==
The word Hindū is an exonym, derived from the Sanskrit word Sindhu, the name of the Indus River as well as the country of the lower Indus basin (Sindh). (Note: The Indo-Aryan word Sindhu means "river", "ocean". It is frequently being used in the Rigveda. The Sindhu-area is part of Āryāvarta, "the land of the Aryans".) The Proto-Iranian sound change *s > h occurred between 850 and 600 BCE. "Hindu" occurs in Avesta as heptahindu, equivalent to Rigvedic sapta sindhu. The 6th-century BCE inscription of Darius I mentions Hindush (referring to Sindh) among his provinces. Hindustan (spelt "hndstn") is found in a Sasanian inscription from the 3rd century CE. The term Hindu in these ancient records is a geographical term and did not refer to a religion. In Arabic texts, "Hind", a derivative of Persian "Hindu", was used to refer to the land beyond the Indus and therefore, all the people in that land were "Hindus", according to historian Romila Thapar. By the 13th century, Hindustan emerged as a popular alternative name of India or northern India.

Among the earliest known records of 'Hindu' with connotations of religion may be in the 7th-century CE Chinese text Record of the Western Regions by Xuanzang. In the 14th century, 'Hindu' appeared in several texts in Persian, Sanskrit and Prakrit within India, and subsequently in vernacular languages, often in comparative contexts to contrast them with Muslims or "Turks". Examples include the 14th-century Persian text Futuhu's-salatin by 'Abd al-Malik Isami, Jain texts such as Vividha Tirtha Kalpa and Vidyatilaka, circa 1400 Apabhramsa text Kīrttilatā by Vidyapati, 16–18th century Bengali Gaudiya Vaishnava texts, etc. These native usages of "Hindu" were borrowed from Persian, and they did not always have a religious connotation, but they often did. In Indian texts, Hindu Dharma ("Hindu religion") was often used to refer to Hinduism.

Starting in the 17th century, European merchants and colonists adopted "Hindu" (often with the English spelling "Hindoo") to refer to residents of India as a religious community. (Note: In the contemporary era, the term Hindus are individuals who identify with one or more aspects of Hinduism, whether they are practising or non-practising or Laissez-faire. The term does not include those who identify with other Indian religions such as Buddhism, Jainism, Sikhism or various animist tribal religions found in India such as Sarnaism. The term Hindu, in contemporary parlance, includes people who accept themselves as culturally or ethnically Hindu rather than with a fixed set of religious beliefs within Hinduism. One need not be religious in the minimal sense, states Julius Lipner, to be accepted as Hindu by Hindus, or to describe oneself as Hindu.) The term got increasingly associated with the practices of Brahmins, who were also referred to as "Gentiles" and "Gentoos". Terms such as "Hindoo faith" and "Hindoo religion" were often used, eventually leading to the appearance of "Hindooism" in a letter of Charles Grant in 1787, who used it along with "Hindu religion". The first Indian to use "Hinduism" may have been Raja Ram Mohan Roy in 1816–17. By the 1840s, the term "Hinduism" was used by those Indians who opposed British colonialism, and who wanted to distinguish themselves from Muslims and Christians. Before the British began to categorise communities strictly by religion, Indians generally did not define themselves exclusively through their religious beliefs; instead identities were largely segmented on the basis of locality, language, varna, jāti, occupation, and sect. (Note: In D. N. Jha's essay Looking for a Hindu identity, he writes: "No Indians described themselves as Hindus before the fourteenth century" and "Hinduism was a creation of the colonial period and cannot lay claim to any great antiquity." He further wrote "The British borrowed the word 'Hindu' from India, gave it a new meaning and significance, [and] reimported it into India as a reified phenomenon called Hinduism.")

== Definitions ==
"Hinduism" is an umbrella-term, referring to a broad range of sometimes opposite and often competitive traditions. In Western ethnography, the term refers to the fusion, or synthesis, of various Indian cultures and traditions, with diverse roots and no founder. This Hindu synthesis emerged after the Vedic period, between c. 500–200 BCE and c. 300 CE, in the period of the Second Urbanisation and the early classical period of Hinduism, when the epics and the first Puranas were composed. It flourished in the medieval period, with the decline of Buddhism in India. Hinduism's variations in belief and its broad range of traditions make it difficult to define as a religion according to traditional Western conceptions.

Hinduism includes a diversity of ideas on spirituality and traditions; Hindus can be polytheistic, pantheistic, panentheistic, pandeistic, henotheistic, monotheistic, monistic, agnostic, atheistic or humanist. According to Mahatma Gandhi, "a man may not believe in God and still call himself a Hindu". According to Wendy Doniger, "ideas about all the major issues of faith and lifestyle – vegetarianism, nonviolence, belief in rebirth, even caste – are subjects of debate, not dogma."

Because of the wide range of traditions and ideas covered by the term Hinduism, arriving at a comprehensive definition is difficult. The religion "defies our desire to define and categorize it". Hinduism has been variously defined as a religion, a religious tradition, a set of religious beliefs, and "a way of life". From a Western lexical standpoint, Hinduism, like other faiths, is appropriately referred to as a religion. In India, the term (Hindu) dharma is used, which is broader than the Western term "religion," and refers to the religious attitudes and behaviours, the 'right way to live', as preserved and transmitted in the various traditions collectively referred to as "Hinduism."

The study of India and its cultures and religions, and the definition of "Hinduism", has been shaped by the interests of colonialism and by Western notions of religion. Since the 1990s, those influences and its outcomes have been the topic of debate among scholars of Hinduism, (Note: Sweetman mentions: Halbfass 1988, India and Europe; Sontheimer 1989, Hinduism Reconsidered; Ronald Inden, Imagining India; Carol Breckenridge and Peter van der Veer, Orientalism and the Postcolonial Predicament; Vasudha Dalmia and Heinrich von Stietencron, Representing Hinduism; S.N. Balagangadhara, The Heathen in his Blindness...; Thomas Trautmann, Aryans and British India; King 1999, Orientalism and religion) and have also been taken over by critics of the Western view on India. (Note: See Rajiv Malhotra and Being Different for a critic who gained widespread attention outside the academia, Invading the Sacred, and Hindu studies.)

=== Typology ===
Om, a stylised letter of the Devanagari script, used as a religious symbol in Hinduism

Hinduism as it is commonly known can be subdivided into a number of major currents. Of the historical division into six darsanas (philosophies), two schools, Vedanta and Yoga, are currently the most prominent. The six āstika schools of Hindu philosophy, which recognise the authority of the Vedas are: Sānkhya, Yoga, Nyāya, Vaisheshika, Mimāmsā, and Vedānta.

Classified by primary deity or deities, four major Hinduism modern currents are Vaishnavism (God Vishnu), Shaivism (God Shiva), Shaktism (Goddess Adi Shakti) and in Smartism (worships five deities treated as equals). Hinduism also accepts numerous divine beings, with many Hindus considering the deities to be aspects or manifestations of a single impersonal absolute or ultimate reality or Supreme God, while some Hindus maintain that a specific deity represents the supreme and various deities are lower manifestations of this supreme. Other notable characteristics include a belief in the existence of ātman (self), reincarnation of one's ātman, and karma as well as a belief in dharma (duties, rights, laws, conduct, virtues and right way of living), although variation exists, with some not following these beliefs.

June McDaniel (2007) classifies Hinduism into six major kinds and numerous minor kinds, in order to understand the expression of emotions among the Hindus. The major kinds, according to McDaniel are Folk Hinduism, based on local traditions and cults of local deities and is the oldest, non-literate system; Vedic Hinduism based on the earliest layers of the Vedas, traceable to the 2nd millennium BCE; Vedantic Hinduism based on the philosophy of the Upanishads, including Advaita Vedanta, emphasising knowledge and wisdom; Yogic Hinduism, following the text of Yoga Sutras of Patanjali emphasising introspective awareness; Dharmic Hinduism or "daily morality", which McDaniel states is stereotyped in some books as the "only form of Hindu religion with a belief in karma, cows and caste"; and bhakti or devotional Hinduism, where intense emotions are elaborately incorporated in the pursuit of the spiritual.

Michaels distinguishes three Hindu religions and four forms of Hindu religiosity. The three Hindu religions are "Brahmanic-Sanskritic Hinduism", "folk religions and tribal religions", and "founded religions". The four forms of Hindu religiosity are the classical "karma-marga", jnana-marga, bhakti-marga, and "heroism", which is rooted in militaristic traditions. These militaristic traditions include Ramaism (the worship of a hero of epic literature, Rama, believing him to be an incarnation of Vishnu) and parts of political Hinduism. "Heroism" is also called virya-marga. According to Michaels, one out of nine Hindu belongs by birth to one or both of the Brahmanic-Sanskritic Hinduism and Folk religion typology, whether practising or non-practicing. He classifies most Hindus as belonging by choice to one of the "founded religions" such as Vaishnavism and Shaivism that are moksha-focussed and often de-emphasise Brahman (Brahmin) priestly authority yet incorporate ritual grammar of Brahmanic-Sanskritic Hinduism. He includes among "founded religions" Buddhism, Jainism, Sikhism that are now distinct religions, syncretic movements such as Brahmo Samaj and the Theosophical Society, as well as various "Guru-isms" and new religious movements such as Transcendental Meditation, BAPS and ISKCON.

Inden states that the attempt to classify Hinduism by typology started in the imperial times, when proselytising missionaries and colonial officials sought to understand and portray Hinduism from their interests. Hinduism was construed as emanating not from a reason of spirit but fantasy and creative imagination, not conceptual but symbolical, not ethical but emotive, not rational or spiritual but of cognitive mysticism. This stereotype followed and fit, states Inden, with the imperial imperatives of the era, providing the moral justification for the colonial project. From tribal Animism to Buddhism, everything was subsumed as part of Hinduism. The early reports set the tradition and scholarly premises for the typology of Hinduism, as well as the major assumptions and flawed presuppositions that have been at the foundation of Indology. Hinduism, according to Inden, has been neither what imperial religionists stereotyped it to be, nor is it appropriate to equate Hinduism to be merely the monist pantheism and philosophical idealism of Advaita Vedanta.

Some academics suggest that Hinduism can be seen as a category with "fuzzy edges" rather than as a well-defined and rigid entity. Some forms of religious expression are central to Hinduism and others, while not as central, still remain within the category. Based on this idea Gabriella Eichinger Ferro-Luzzi has developed a 'Prototype Theory approach' to the definition of Hinduism.

=== Sanātana Dharma ===
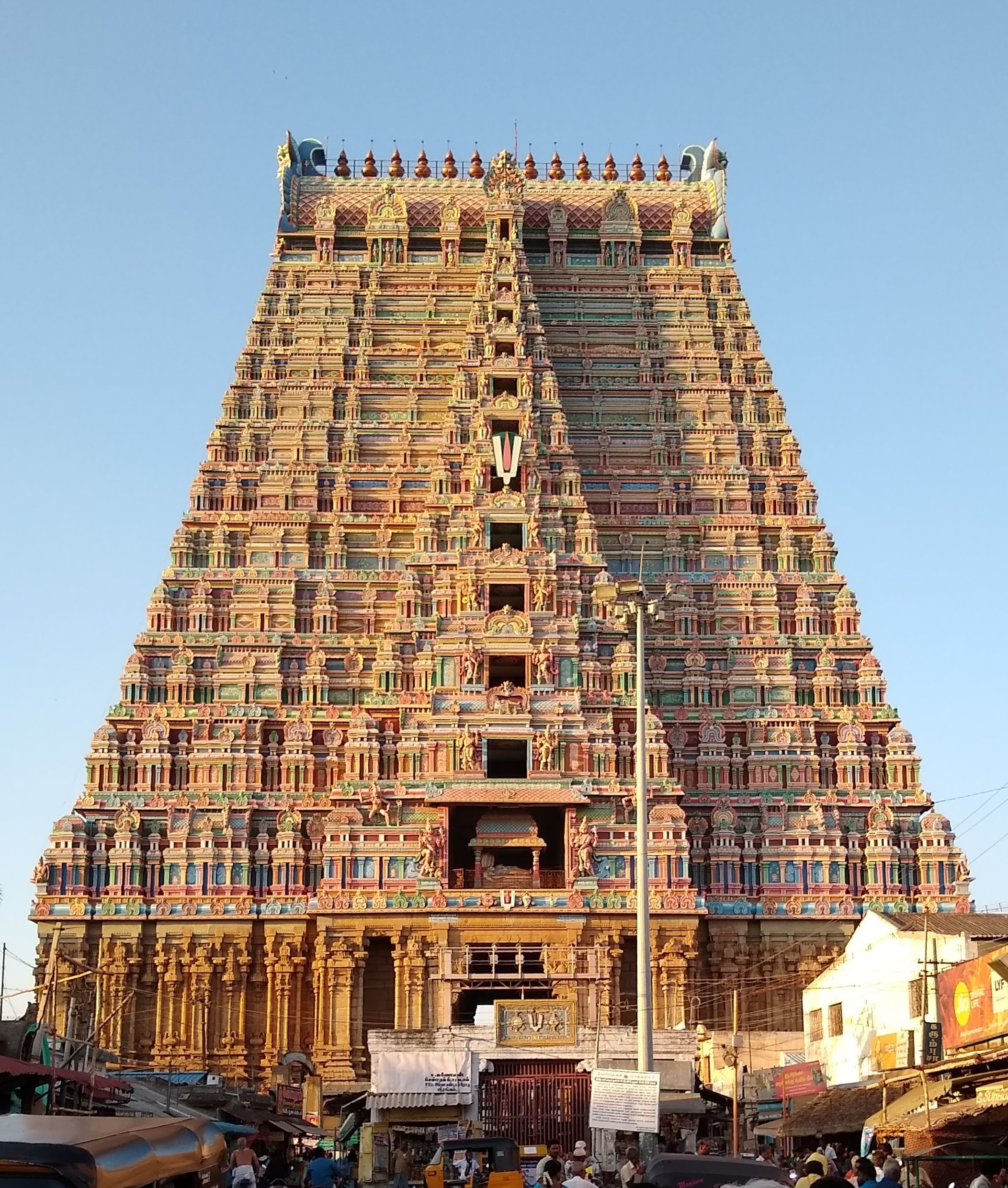
Srirangam Ranganathaswamy Temple, dedicated to the Hindu deity Vishnu, is said to be worshiped by Ikshvaku (and the descendants of Ikshvaku Vamsam).

To its adherents, Hinduism is a traditional way of life. Many practitioners refer to the "orthodox" form of Hinduism as Sanātana Dharma, "the eternal law" or the "eternal way". Hindus regard Hinduism to be thousands of years old. The Puranic chronology, as narrated in the Mahabharata, Ramayana, and the Puranas, envisions a timeline of events related to Hinduism starting well before 3000 BCE. The word dharma is used here to mean religion similar to modern Indo-Aryan languages, rather than with its original Sanskrit meaning. All aspects of a Hindu life, namely acquiring wealth (artha), fulfilment of desires (kama), and attaining liberation (moksha), are viewed here as part of "dharma", which encapsulates the "right way of living" and eternal harmonious principles in their fulfilment. The use of the term Sanātana Dharma for Hinduism is a modern usage, based on the belief that the origins of Hinduism lie beyond human history.

Sanātana Dharma refers to "timeless, eternal set of truths" and this is how Hindus view the origins of their religion. It is viewed as those eternal truths and traditions with origins beyond Human history– truths divinely revealed (Shruti) in the Vedas, the most ancient of the world's scriptures. To many Hindus, Hinduism is a tradition that can be traced at least to the ancient Vedic era. The Western term "religion" to the extent it means "dogma and an institution traceable to a single founder" is inappropriate for their tradition, states Hatcher. (Note: The term sanatana dharma and its Vedic roots had another context in the colonial era, particularly the early 19th-century through movements such as the Brahmo Samaj and the Arya Samaj. These movements, particularly active in British and French colonies outside India, such as in Africa and the Caribbean, interpreted Hinduism to be a monotheistic religion and attempted to demonstrate that vis-à-vis Christianity and Islam. Their views were opposed by other Hindus such as the Sanatan Dharma Sabha of 1895.)

Sanātana Dharma historically referred to the "eternal" duties religiously ordained in Hinduism, duties such as honesty, refraining from injuring living beings (ahiṃsā), purity, goodwill, mercy, patience, forbearance, self-restraint, generosity, and asceticism. These duties applied regardless of a Hindu's class, caste, or sect, and they contrasted with svadharma, one's "own duty", in accordance with one's class or caste (varṇa) and stage in life (puruṣārtha). In recent years, the term has been used by Hindu leaders, reformers, and nationalists to refer to Hinduism. Sanatana dharma has become a synonym for the "eternal" truth and teachings of Hinduism, that transcend history and are "unchanging, indivisible and ultimately nonsectarian".

=== Vaidika Dharma ===
Some have referred to Hinduism as the Vaidika dharma, bypassing the Tantric revelations. The word 'Vaidika' in Sanskrit means 'derived from or conformable to the Veda' or 'relating to the Veda'. Traditional scholars employed the terms Vaidika and Avaidika, those who accept the Vedas as a source of authoritative knowledge and those who do not, to differentiate various Indian schools from Jainism, Buddhism and Charvaka. According to P.T. Raju, heterodox traditions rejected the label 'Vaidika dharma' due to its association with Vedic sacrifices, but adopted the broader category of 'Aryadharma'. According to Klaus Klostermaier, the term Vaidika dharma is the earliest self-designation of Hinduism. According to Arvind Sharma, the historical evidence suggests that "the Hindus were referring to their religion by the term vaidika dharma or a variant thereof" by the 4th-century CE. According to Brian K. Smith, "[i]t is 'debatable at the very least' as to whether the term Vaidika Dharma cannot, with the proper concessions to historical, cultural, and ideological specificity, be comparable to and translated as 'Hinduism' or 'Hindu religion'."

Whatever the case, many Hindu religious sources see persons or groups which they consider as non-Vedic (and which reject Vedic varṇāśrama – 'caste and life stage' orthodoxy) as being heretics (pāṣaṇḍa/pākhaṇḍa). For example, the Bhāgavata Purāṇa considers Buddhists, Jains as well as some Shaiva groups like the Paśupatas and Kāpālins to be pāṣaṇḍas (heretics).

According to Alexis Sanderson, the early Sanskrit texts differentiate between Vaidika, Vaishnava, Shaiva, Shakta, Saura, Buddhist and Jaina traditions. However, the late 1st-millennium CE Indic consensus had "indeed come to conceptualize a complex entity corresponding to Hinduism as opposed to Buddhism and Jainism excluding only certain forms of antinomian Shakta-Shaiva" from its fold. Some in the Mimamsa school of Hindu philosophy considered the Agamas such as the Pancaratrika to be invalid because it did not conform to the Vedas. Some Kashmiri scholars rejected the esoteric tantric traditions to be a part of Vaidika dharma. The Atimarga Shaivism ascetic tradition, datable to about 500 CE, challenged the Vaidika frame and insisted that their Agamas and practices were not only valid, they were superior than those of the Vaidikas. However, adds Sanderson, this Shaiva ascetic tradition viewed themselves as being genuinely true to the Vedic tradition and "held unanimously that the Śruti and Smṛti of Brahmanism are universally and uniquely valid in their own sphere, [...] and that as such they [Vedas] are man's sole means of valid knowledge [...]".

The term Vaidika dharma means a code of practice that is "based on the Vedas", but it is unclear what "based on the Vedas" really implies, states Julius Lipner. The Vaidika dharma or "Vedic way of life", states Lipner, does not mean "Hinduism is necessarily religious" or that Hindus have a universally accepted "conventional or institutional meaning" for that term. To many, it is as much a cultural term. Many Hindus do not have a copy of the Vedas nor have they ever seen or personally read parts of a Veda, like a Christian, might relate to the Bible or a Muslim might to the Quran. Yet, states Lipner, "this does not mean that their [Hindus] whole life's orientation cannot be traced to the Vedas or that it does not in some way derive from it".

Though many religious Hindus implicitly acknowledge the authority of the Vedas, this acknowledgment is often "no more than a declaration that someone considers himself [or herself] a Hindu," (Note: Lipner quotes Brockington (1981), The sacred tread, p. 5.) and "most Indians today pay lip service to the Veda and have no regard for the contents of the text." Some Hindus challenge the authority of the Vedas, thereby implicitly acknowledging its importance to the history of Hinduism, states Lipner.

=== Legal definition ===
Bal Gangadhar Tilak gave the following definition in Gita Rahasya (1915): "Acceptance of the Vedas with reverence; recognition of the fact that the means or ways to salvation are diverse; and realization of the truth that the number of gods to be worshipped is large". It was quoted by the Indian Supreme Court in 1966, and again in 1995, "as an 'adequate and satisfactory definition," and is still the legal definition of a Hindu today.

== Diversity and unity ==
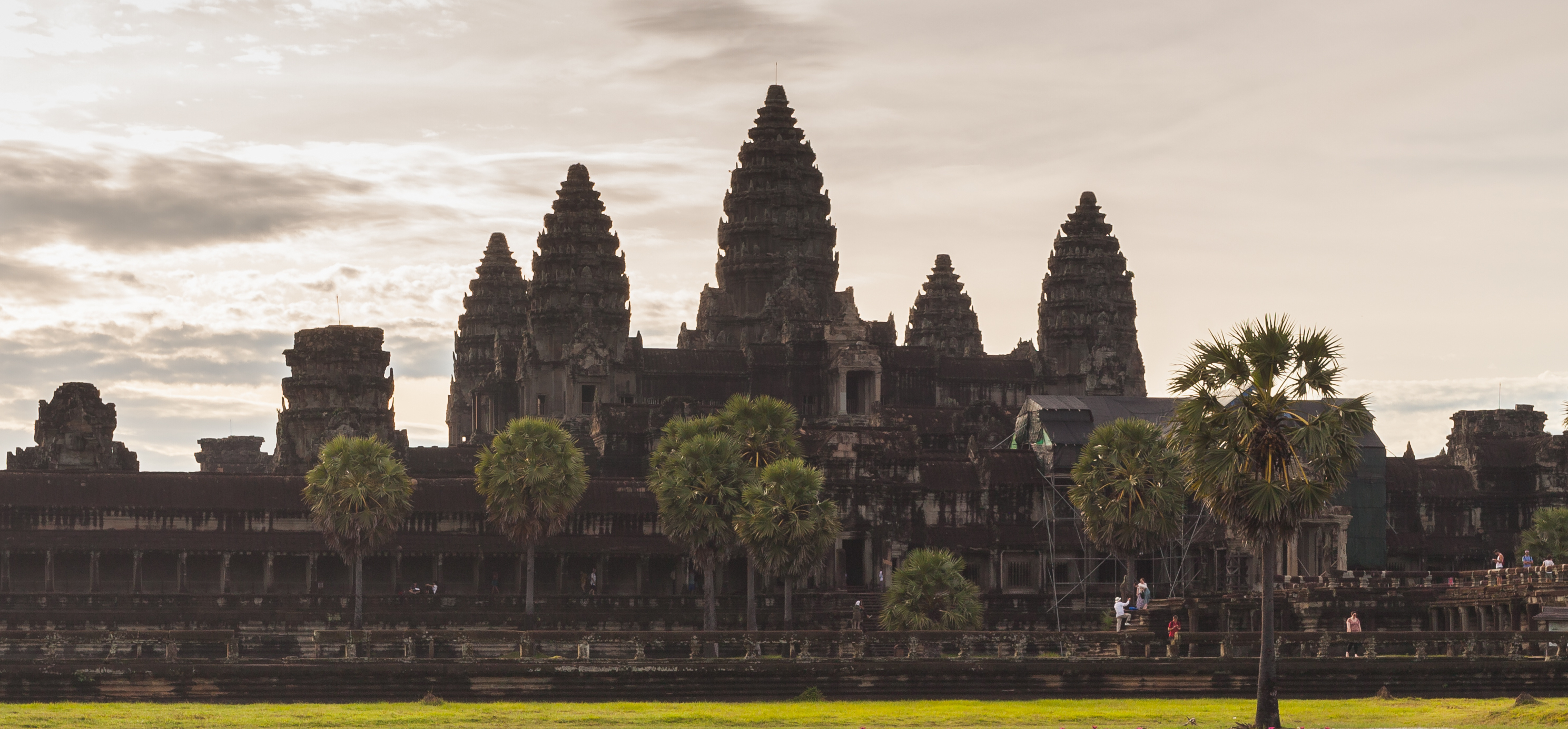
Angkor Wat temple in Cambodia, the largest Hindu temple in the world

=== Diversity ===
Hindu beliefs are vast and diverse, and thus Hinduism is often referred to as a "family of religions" rather than a single religion. Within each tradition in Hinduism, there are different theologies, practices, and sacred texts, often including unique interpretations, commentaries, and derivative works that build upon shared foundational scriptures. Hinduism does not have a "unified system of belief encoded in a declaration of faith or a creed", but is rather an umbrella term comprising the plurality of religious phenomena of India. According to the Supreme Court of India,

Unlike other religions in the World, the Hindu religion does not claim any one Prophet, it does not worship any one God, it does not believe in any one philosophic concept, it does not follow any one act of religious rites or performances; in fact, it does not satisfy the traditional features of a religion or creed. It is a way of life and nothing more".

Part of the problem with a single definition of the term Hinduism is the fact that Hinduism does not have a founder. It is a synthesis of various traditions, the "Brahmanical orthopraxy, the renouncer traditions and popular or local traditions".

Theism is also difficult to use as a unifying doctrine for Hinduism, because while some Hindu philosophies postulate a theistic ontology of creation, other Hindus are or have been atheists.

=== Sense of unity ===
Despite the differences, there is also a sense of unity. Most Hindu traditions revere a body of religious or sacred literature, the Vedas, although there are exceptions. These texts are a reminder of the ancient cultural heritage and point of pride for Hindus, though Louis Renou stated that "even in the most orthodox domains, the reverence to the Vedas has come to be a simple raising of the hat".

Halbfass states that, although Shaivism and Vaishnavism may be regarded as "self-contained religious constellations", there is a degree of interaction and reference between the "theoreticians and literary representatives" of each tradition that indicates the presence of "a wider sense of identity, a sense of coherence in a shared context and of inclusion in a common framework and horizon".

==== Classical Hinduism ====
Brahmins played an essential role in the development of the post-Vedic Hindu synthesis, disseminating Vedic culture to local communities, and integrating local religiosity into the trans-regional Brahmanic culture. In the post-Gupta period Vedanta developed in southern India, where orthodox Brahmanic culture and the Hindu culture were preserved, building on ancient Vedic traditions while "accommoda[ting] the multiple demands of Hinduism."

==== Medieval developments ====
The notion of common denominators for several religions and traditions of India further developed from the 12th century CE. Lorenzen traces the emergence of a "family resemblance", and what he calls as "beginnings of medieval and modern Hinduism" taking shape, at c. 300–600 CE, with the development of the early Puranas, and continuities with the earlier Vedic religion. Lorenzen states that the establishment of a Hindu self-identity took place "through a process of mutual self-definition with a contrasting Muslim Other". According to Lorenzen, this "presence of the Other" is necessary to recognise the "loose family resemblance" among the various traditions and schools.

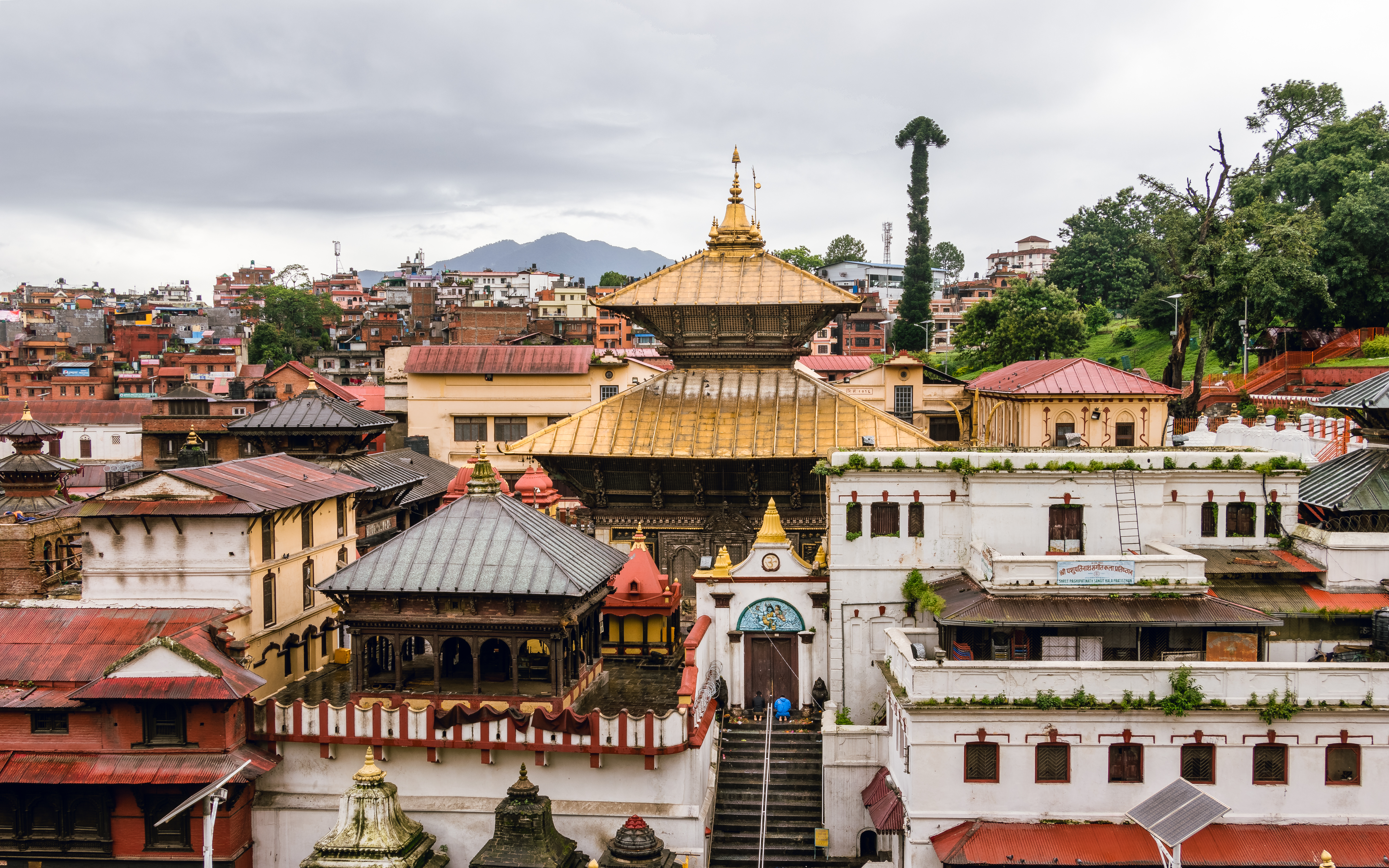
Pashupatinath Temple in Nepal, dedicated to the Hindu deity Shiva as the lord of all beings

According to the Indologist Alexis Sanderson, before Islam arrived in India, the "Sanskrit sources differentiated Vaidika, Vaiṣṇava, Śaiva, Śākta, Saura, Buddhist, and Jaina traditions, but they had no name that denotes the first five of these as a collective entity over and against Buddhism and Jainism". This absence of a formal name, states Sanderson, does not mean that the corresponding concept of Hinduism did not exist. By late 1st-millennium CE, the concept of a belief and tradition distinct from Buddhism and Jainism had emerged. This complex tradition accepted in its identity almost all of what is currently Hinduism, except certain antinomian tantric movements. Some conservative thinkers of those times questioned whether certain Shaiva, Vaishnava and Shakta texts or practices were consistent with the Vedas, or were invalid in their entirety. Moderates then, and most orthoprax scholars later, agreed that though there are some variations, the foundation of their beliefs, the ritual grammar, the spiritual premises, and the soteriologies were the same. "This sense of greater unity", states Sanderson, "came to be called Hinduism".

According to Nicholson, already between the 12th and the 16th centuries "certain thinkers began to treat as a single whole the diverse philosophical teachings of the Upanishads, epics, Puranas, and the schools known retrospectively as the 'six systems' (saddarsana) of mainstream Hindu philosophy." The tendency of "a blurring of philosophical distinctions" has also been noted by Mikel Burley. Hacker called this "inclusivism" and Michaels speaks of "the identificatory habit". Lorenzen locates the origins of a distinct Hindu identity in the interaction between Muslims and Hindus, and a process of "mutual self-definition with a contrasting Muslim other", which started well before 1800. Michaels notes:

As a counteraction to Islamic supremacy and as part of the continuing process of regionalization, two religious innovations developed in the Hindu religions: the formation of sects and a historicization which preceded later nationalism ... [S]aints and sometimes militant sect leaders, such as the Marathi poet Tukaram (1609–1649) and Ramdas (1608–1681), articulated ideas in which they glorified Hinduism and the past. The Brahmins also produced increasingly historical texts, especially eulogies and chronicles of sacred sites (Mahatmyas), or developed a reflexive passion for collecting and compiling extensive collections of quotations on various subjects.

==== Colonial views ====
The notion and reports on "Hinduism" as a "single world religious tradition" were also popularised by 19th-century proselytising missionaries and European Indologists, roles sometimes served by the same person, who relied on texts preserved by Brahmins (priests) for their information of Indian religions, and animist observations that the missionary Orientalists presumed was Hinduism. These reports influenced perceptions about Hinduism. Scholars such as Pennington state that the colonial polemical reports led to fabricated stereotypes where Hinduism was mere mystic paganism devoted to the service of devils, (Note: Pennington describes the circumstances in which early impressions of Hinduism were reported by colonial era missionaries: "Missionary reports from India also reflected the experience of foreigners in a land whose native inhabitants and British rulers often resented their presence. Their accounts of Hinduism were forged in physically, politically and spiritually hostile surroundings [impoverished, famine-prone Bengal – now West Bengal and Bangladesh]. Plagued with anxieties and fears about their own health, regularly reminded of colleagues who had lost their lives or reason, uncertain of their own social location, and preaching to crowds whose reactions ranged from indifference to amusement to hostility, missionaries found expression for their darker misgivings in their production of what is surely part of their speckled legacy: a fabricated Hinduism crazed by blood-lust and devoted to the service of devils.") while other scholars state that the colonial constructions influenced the belief that the Vedas, Bhagavad Gita, Manusmriti and such texts were the essence of Hindu religiosity, and in the modern association of 'Hindu doctrine' with the schools of Vedanta (in particular Advaita Vedanta) as a paradigmatic example of Hinduism's mystical nature". (Note: Sweetman (2004, p. 13) identifies several areas in which "there is substantial, if not universal, an agreement that colonialism influenced the study of Hinduism, even if the degree of this influence is debated": The wish of European Orientalists "to establish a textual basis for Hinduism", akin to the Protestant culture,(Sweetman 2004, p. 13) which was also driven by preference among the colonial powers for "written authority" rather than "oral authority".(Sweetman 2004, p. 13); The influence of Brahmins on European conceptions of Hinduism.(Sweetman 2004, p. 13); [T]he identification of Vedanta, more specifically Advaita Vedanta, as 'the paradigmatic example of the mystical nature of the Hindu religion'.(Sweetman 2004, p. 13) (Sweetman cites King 1999, p. 128.) Several factors led to the favouring of Vedanta as the "central philosophy of the Hindus":(Sweetman 2004, pp. 13–14); According to Niranjan Dhar's theory that Vedanta was favoured because British feared French influence, especially the impact of the French Revolution; and Ronald Inden's theory that Advaita Vedanta was portrayed as 'illusionist pantheism' reinforcing the colonial stereotypical construction of Hinduism as indifferent to ethics and life-negating.(Sweetman 2004, pp. 13–14); "The amenability of Vedantic thought to both Christian and Hindu critics of 'idolatry' in other forms of Hinduism".(Sweetman 2004, p. 14); The colonial constructions of caste as being part of Hinduism.(Sweetman 2004, pp. 14–16) According to Nicholas Dirks' theory that, "Caste was refigured as a religious system, organising society in a context where politics and religion had never before been distinct domains of social action. (Sweetman cites Dirks 2001, p. xxvii.); "[T]he construction of Hinduism in the image of Christianity"(Sweetman 2004, p. 15); Anti-colonial Hindus(Sweetman 2004, pp. 15–16) "looking toward the systematisation of disparate practices as a means of recovering a pre-colonial, national identity".(Sweetman 2004, p. 15) (Sweetman cites Viswanathan 2003, p. 26.)) Pennington, while concurring that the study of Hinduism as a world religion began in the colonial era, disagrees that Hinduism is a colonial European era invention. He states that the shared theology, common ritual grammar and way of life of those who identify themselves as Hindus is traceable to ancient times. (Note: Many scholars have presented pre-colonial common denominators and asserted the importance of ancient Hindu textual sources in medieval and pre-colonial times: Klaus Witz states that Hindu Bhakti movement ideas in the medieval era grew on the foundation of Upanishadic knowledge and Vedanta philosophies.; John Henderson states that "Hindus, both in medieval and in modern times, have been particularly drawn to those canonical texts and philosophical schools such as the Bhagavad Gita and Vedanta, which seem to synthesize or reconcile most successfully diverse philosophical teachings and sectarian points of view. Thus, this widely recognised attribute of Indian culture may be traced to the exegetical orientation of medieval Hindu commentarial traditions, especially Vedanta.; Patrick Olivelle and others state that the central ideas of the Upanishads in the Vedic corpus are at the spiritual core of Hindus.)

==== Hindu modernism and neo-Vedanta ====
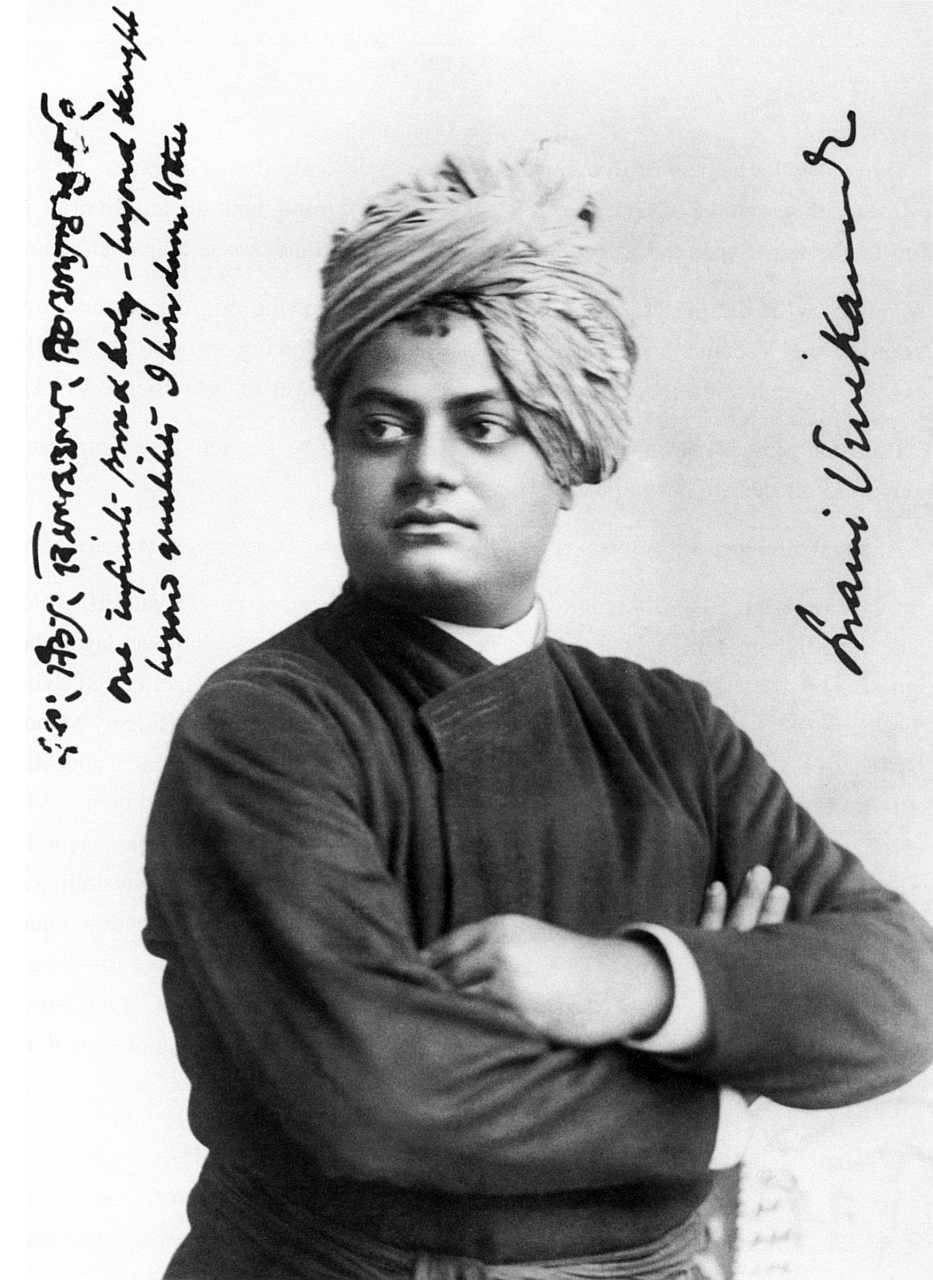
Swami Vivekananda was a key figure in introducing Vedanta and Yoga in Europe and the United States, raising interfaith awareness and making Hinduism a world religion.

All of religion is contained in the Vedanta, that is, in the three stages of the Vedanta philosophy, the Dvaita, Vishishtâdvaita and Advaita; one comes after the other. These are the three stages of spiritual growth in man. Each one is necessary. This is the essential of religion: the Vedanta, applied to the various ethnic customs and creeds of India, is Hinduism.

— Swami Vivekananda

This inclusivism was further developed in the 19th and 20th centuries by Hindu reform movements and Neo-Vedanta, and has become characteristic of modern Hinduism.

Beginning in the 19th century, Indian modernists re-asserted Hinduism as a major asset of Indian civilisation, meanwhile "purifying" Hinduism from its Tantric elements and elevating the Vedic elements. Western stereotypes were reversed, emphasising the universal aspects, and introducing modern approaches of social problems. This approach had great appeal, not only in India, but also in the west. Major representatives of "Hindu modernism" are Ram Mohan Roy, Swami Vivekananda, Sarvepalli Radhakrishnan and Mahatma Gandhi.

Raja Rammohan Roy is known as the father of the Hindu Renaissance. He was a major influence on Swami Vivekananda, who, according to Flood, was "a figure of great importance in the development of a modern Hindu self-understanding and in formulating the West's view of Hinduism". Central to his philosophy is the idea that the divine exists in all beings, that all human beings can achieve union with this "innate divinity", and that seeing this divine as the essence of others will further love and social harmony. According to Vivekananda, there is an essential unity to Hinduism, which underlies the diversity of its many forms. According to Flood, Vivekananda's vision of Hinduism "is one generally accepted by most English-speaking middle-class Hindus today". Sarvepalli Radhakrishnan sought to reconcile western rationalism with Hinduism, "presenting Hinduism as an essentially rationalistic and humanistic religious experience".

This "Global Hinduism" has a worldwide appeal, transcending national boundaries and, according to Flood, "becoming a world religion alongside Christianity, Islam and Buddhism", both for the Hindu diaspora communities and for westerners who are attracted to non-western cultures and religions. It emphasises universal spiritual values such as social justice, peace and "the spiritual transformation of humanity". It has developed partly due to "re-enculturation", or the pizza effect, in which elements of Hindu culture have been exported to the West, gaining popularity there, and as a consequence also gained greater popularity in India. This globalisation of Hindu culture brought "to the West teachings which have become an important cultural force in western societies, and which in turn have become an important cultural force in India, their place of origin".

==== Modern India and the world ====
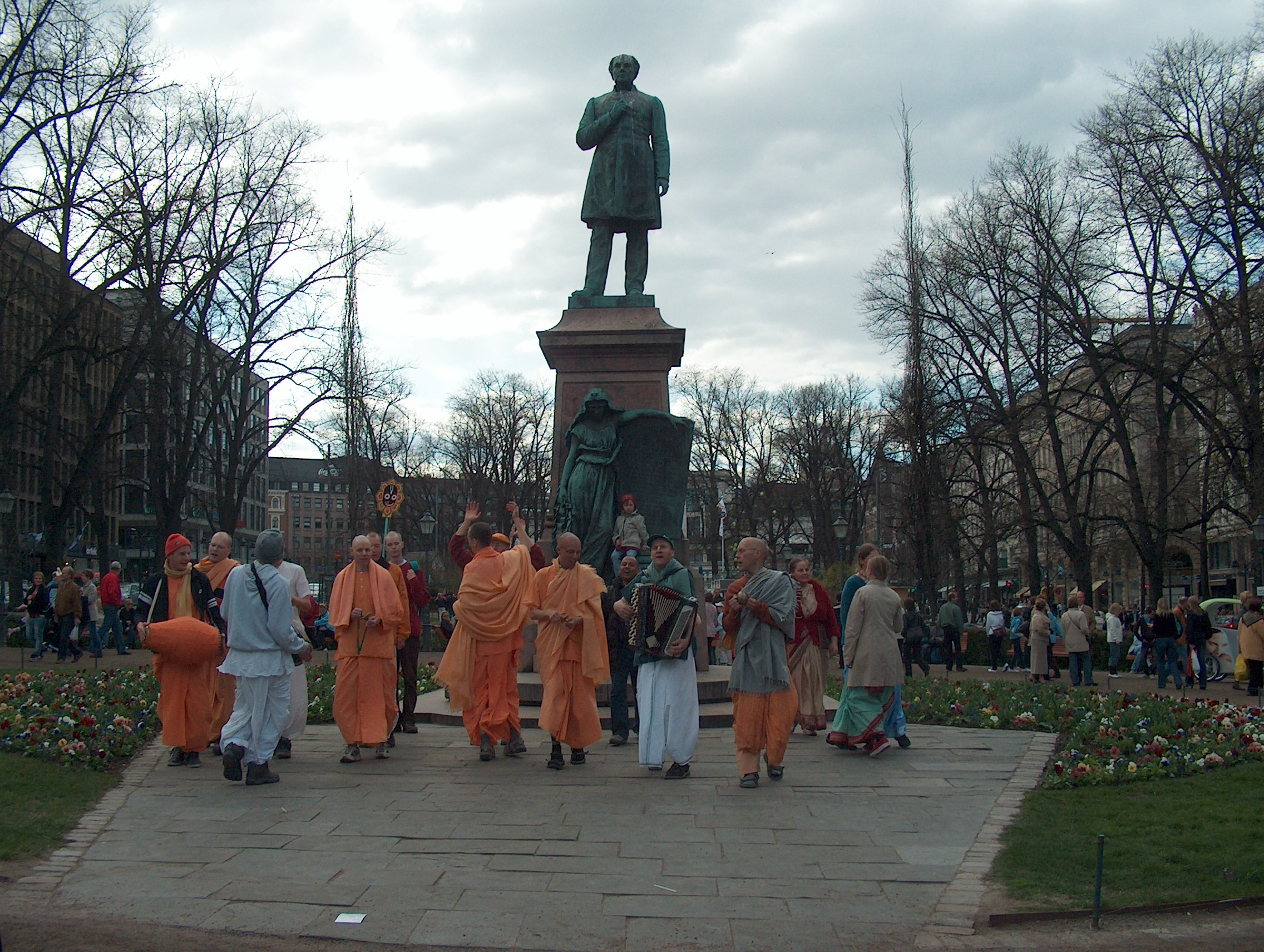
The Hare Krishna group at the Esplanadi Park in Helsinki, Finland

The scope of Hinduism is increasing in the other parts of the world, due to cultural influences such as yoga, organisations such as the Hare Krishna movement and ISKCON, as well as the migration of Indian Hindus.

== Main traditions ==
=== Denominations ===
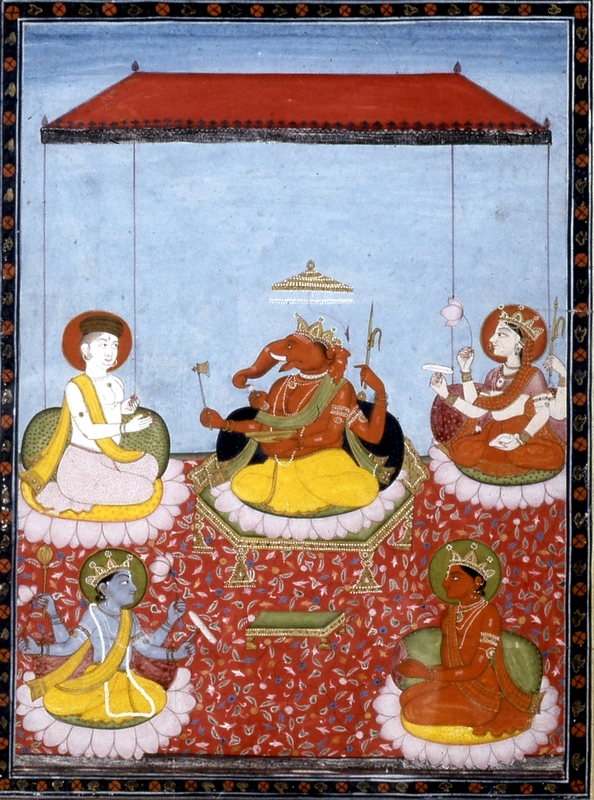
A Ganesha-centric Panchayatana ("five deities", from the Smarta tradition): Ganesha (centre) with Shiva (top left), Parvati (top right), Vishnu (bottom left) and Surya (bottom right). All these deities also have separate sects dedicated to them.

Hinduism has no central doctrinal authority and many practising Hindus do not claim to belong to any particular denomination or tradition. Four major denominations are, however, used in scholarly studies: Shaivism, Shaktism, Smartism, and Vaishnavism. These denominations differ primarily in the central deity worshipped, the traditions and the soteriological outlook. The denominations of Hinduism, states Lipner, are unlike those found in major religions of the world, because Hindu denominations are fuzzy with individuals practising more than one, and he suggests the term "Hindu polycentrism".

There are no census data available on demographic history or trends for the traditions within Hinduism. Estimates vary on the relative number of adherents in the different traditions of Hinduism. According to a 2020 estimate by The World Religion Database (WRD), hosted at Boston University's Institute on Culture, Religion and World Affairs (CURA), the Vaishnavism tradition is the largest group with about 399 million Hindus, followed by Shaivism with 385 million Hindus, Shaktism with 305 million Hindus and other traditions including Neo-Hinduism and Reform Hinduism with 25 million Hindus. In contrast, according to Jones and Ryan, Shaivism is the largest tradition of Hinduism. (Note: According to Jones & Ryan 2007, p. 474, "The followers of Vaishnavism are many fewer than those of Shaivism, numbering perhaps 200 million.")

Vaishnavism is the devotional religious tradition that worships Vishnu (Note: sometimes with Lakshmi, the spouse of Vishnu; or, as Narayana and Sri;) and his avatars, particularly Krishna and Rama. The adherents of this sect are generally non-ascetic, monastic, oriented towards community events and devotionalism practices inspired by "intimate loving, joyous, playful" Krishna and other Vishnu avatars. These practices sometimes include community dancing, singing of Kirtans and Bhajans, with sound and music believed by some to have meditative and spiritual powers. Temple worship and festivals are typically elaborate in Vaishnavism. The Bhagavad Gita and the Ramayana, along with Vishnu-oriented Puranas provide its theistic foundations.

Shaivism is the tradition that focuses on Shiva. Shaivas are more attracted to ascetic individualism, and it has several sub-schools. Their practices include bhakti-style devotionalism, yet their beliefs lean towards nondual, monistic schools of Hinduism such as Advaita and Raja Yoga. Some Shaivas worship in temples, while others emphasise yoga, striving to be one with Shiva within. Avatars are uncommon, and some Shaivas visualise god as half male, half female, as a fusion of the male and female principles (Ardhanarishvara). Shaivism is related to Shaktism, wherein Shakti is seen as spouse of Shiva. Community celebrations include festivals, and participation, with Vaishnavas, in pilgrimages such as the Kumbh Mela. Shaivism has been more commonly practised in the Himalayan north from Kashmir to Nepal, and in south India.

Shaktism focuses on goddess worship of Shakti or Devi as cosmic mother, and it is particularly common in northeastern and eastern states of India such as Assam and Bengal. Devi is depicted as in gentler forms like Parvati, the consort of Shiva; or, as fierce warrior goddesses like Kali and Durga. Followers of Shaktism recognise Shakti as the power that underlies the male principle. Shaktism is also associated with Tantra practices. Community celebrations include festivals, some of which include processions and idol immersion into sea or other water bodies.

Smartism centers its worship simultaneously on all the major Hindu deities: Shiva, Vishnu, Shakti, Ganesha, Surya and Skanda. The Smarta tradition developed during the (early) Classical Period of Hinduism around the beginning of the Common Era, when Hinduism emerged from the interaction between Brahmanism and local traditions. The Smarta tradition is aligned with Advaita Vedanta, and regards Adi Shankara as its founder or reformer, who considered worship of God-with-attributes (Saguna Brahman) as a journey towards ultimately realising God-without-attributes (nirguna Brahman, Atman, Self-knowledge). The term Smartism is derived from Smriti texts of Hinduism, meaning those who remember the traditions in the texts. This Hindu sect practices a philosophical Jnana yoga, scriptural studies, reflection, meditative path seeking an understanding of Self's oneness with God.

=== Ethnicities ===
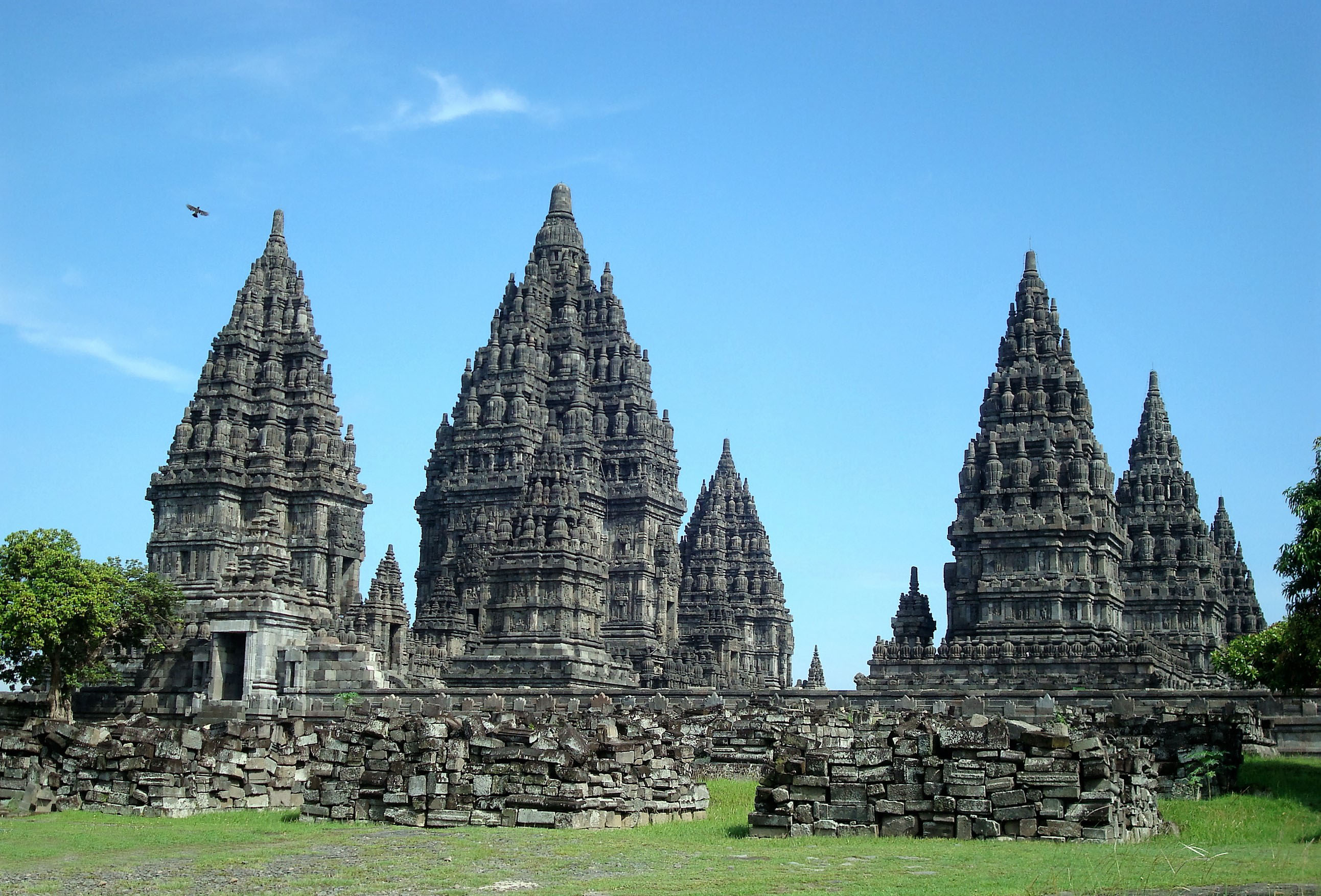
Prambanan Hindu temple complex built in the 9th century, Java, Indonesia

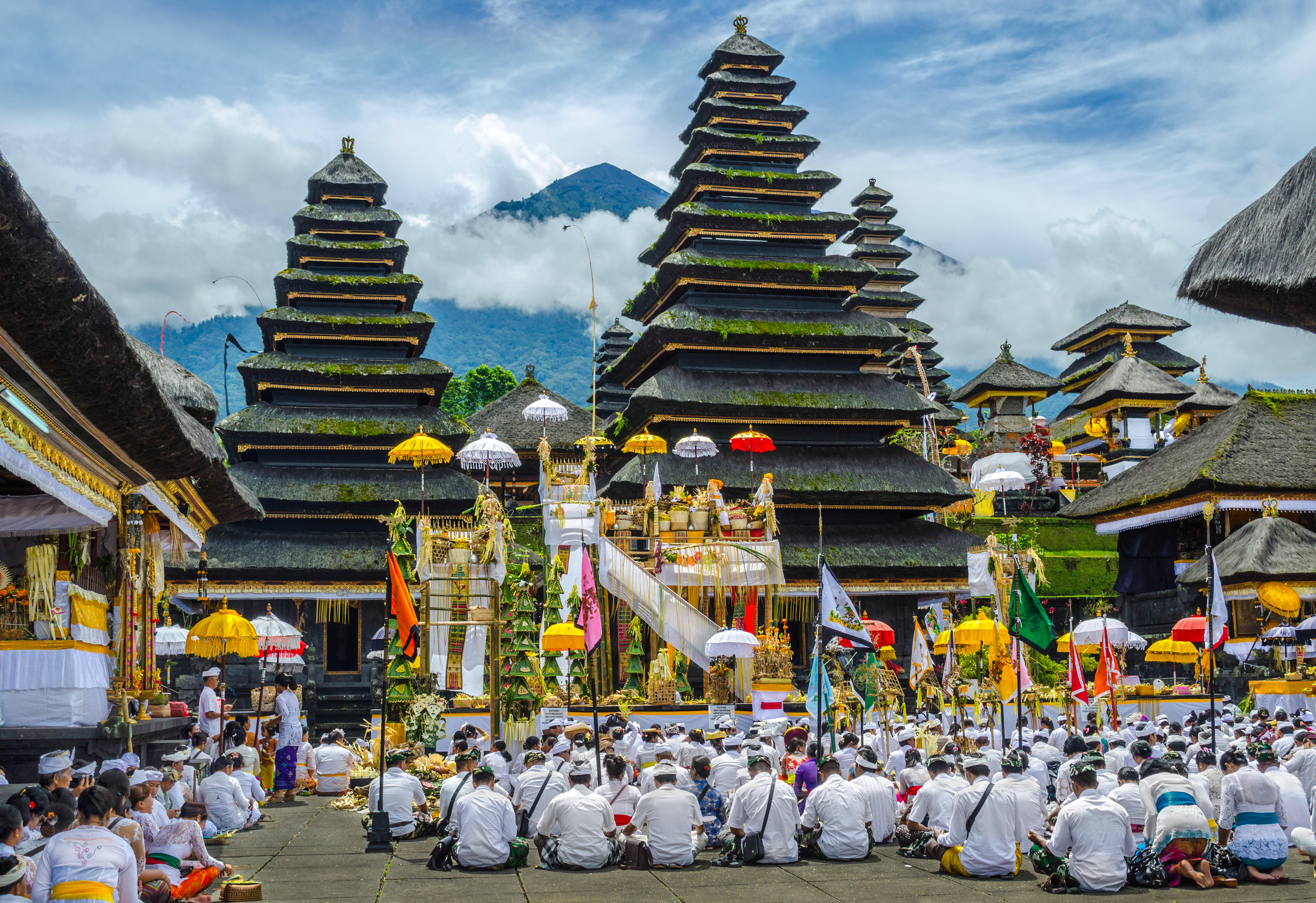
Puja at Pura Besakih, one of the most significant Balinese Hinduism temples

Hinduism is traditionally a multi- or polyethnic religion. On the Indian subcontinent, it is widespread among many Indo-Aryan, Dravidian and other South Asian ethnic groups, for example, the Meitei people (Tibeto-Burman ethnicity in the northeastern Indian state Manipur).

In addition, in antiquity and the Middle Ages, Hinduism was the state religion in many Indianized kingdoms of Asia, the Greater India – from Afghanistan (Kabul) in the West and including almost all of Southeast Asia in the East (Cambodia, Vietnam, Indonesia, partly Philippines) – and only by the 15th century was nearly everywhere supplanted by Buddhism and Islam, except several still Hindu minor Austronesian ethnic groups, such as the Balinese and Tenggerese people in Indonesia, and the Chams in Vietnam. Also, a small community of the Afghan Pashtuns who migrated to India after partition remain committed to Hinduism.

The Indo-Aryan Kalash people in Pakistan traditionally practice an indigenous religion which is closely related to ancient Indo-Iranian religion, and resembles the ancient Vedic religion. While it has been related to Greek religion, due to an origin-narrative which says that the Kalash descend from Alexander the Great's Greek soldiers, the Kalash speak an Indo-Aryan language, and their religion is closer to Hinduism than to the religion of Alexander's army.

There are many new ethnic Ghanaian Hindus in Ghana, who have converted to Hinduism due to the works of Swami Ghanananda Saraswati and Hindu Monastery of Africa From the beginning of the 20th century, by the forces of Baba Premananda Bharati (1858–1914), Swami Vivekananda, A. C. Bhaktivedanta Swami Prabhupada and other missionaries, Hinduism gained a certain distribution among the Western peoples.

== Scriptures ==
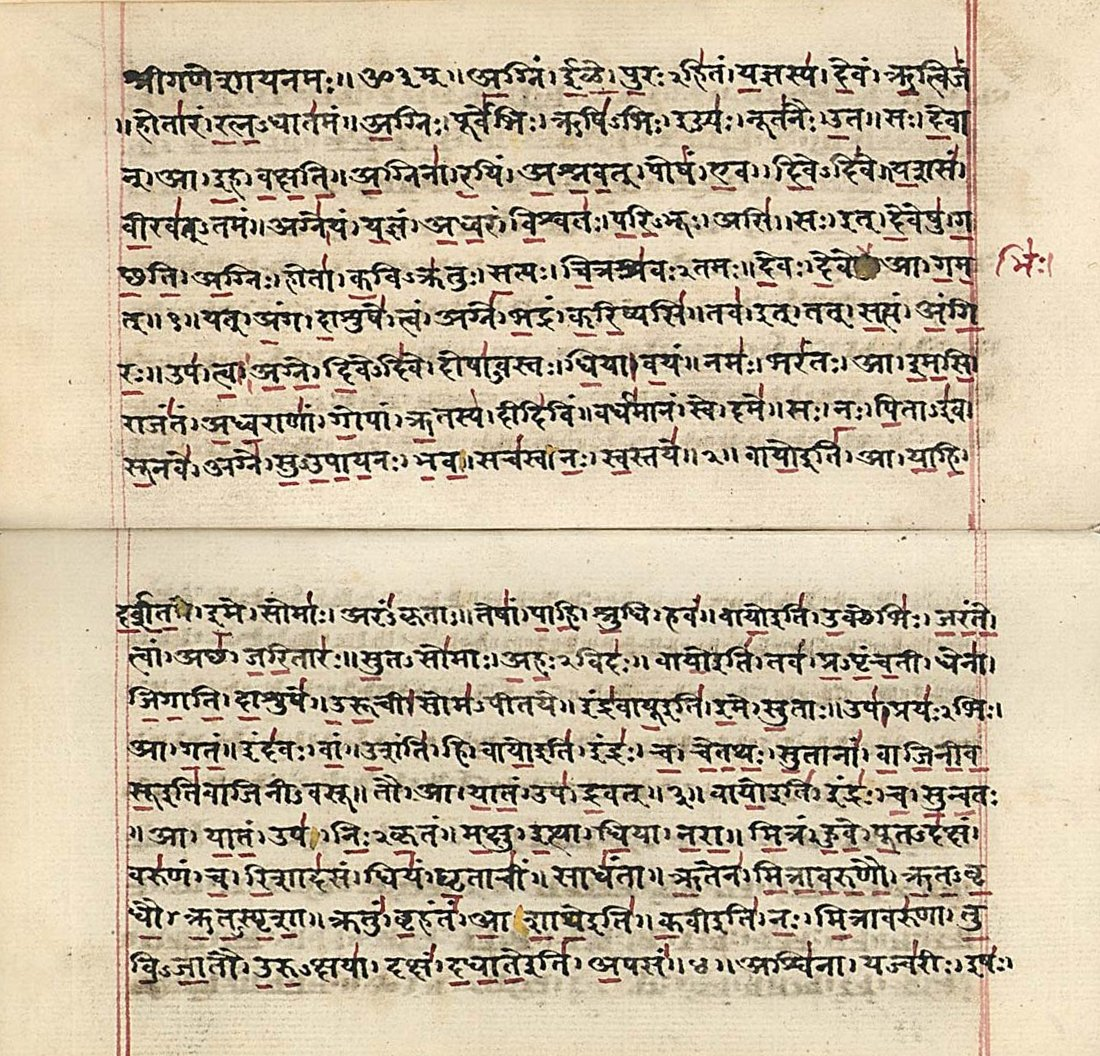
The Rigveda is the first among four Vedas (Note: Rigveda is not only the oldest among the Vedas, but is one of the earliest Indo-European texts.) and is one of the oldest religious texts. This Rigveda manuscript is in Sanskrit.

The ancient scriptures of Hinduism are initially in Vedic Sanskrit and later in classical Sanskrit. These texts are classified into two: Śruti and Smṛti. Shruti is apauruṣeyā, (lit. 'not made of a man') but revealed by the rishis (lit. 'seers'), and regarded as having the highest authority, while the smriti are manmade and have secondary authority. They are the two highest sources of dharma, the other two being Śiṣṭa Āchāra/Sadāchara (lit. 'conduct of noble people') and finally Ātma tuṣṭi (lit. 'what is pleasing to oneself'). (Note: According to Bhavishya Purana, Brahmaparva, Adhyaya 7, there are four sources of dharma: Śruti (Vedas), Smṛti (Dharmaśāstras, Puranas), Śiṣṭa Āchāra/Sadāchara (conduct of noble people) and finally Ātma tuṣṭi (Self satisfaction). From the sloka: वेदः स्मृतिः सदाचारः स्वस्य च प्रियमात्मनः । एतच्चतुर्विधं प्राहुः साक्षाद्धर्मस्य लक्षणम् ॥ vedaḥ smṛtiḥ sadācāraḥ svasya ca priyamātmanah etaccaturvidham prāhuḥ sākshāddharmasya lakshaṇam – Bhavishya Purāṇa, Brahmaparva, Adhyāya 7 The meaning is vedas, smritis, good (approved) tradition and what is agreeable to one's Self (conscience), the wise have declared to be the four direct evidences of dharma.)

Hindu scriptures were composed, memorised and transmitted verbally, across generations, for many centuries before they were written down.

Shruti (lit. 'that which is heard') primarily refers to the Vedas, which form the earliest record of the Hindu scriptures, and are regarded as eternal truths revealed to the ancient sages (rishis). There are four Vedas – Rigveda, Samaveda, Yajurveda and Atharvaveda. Each Veda has been subclassified into four major text types – the Samhitas (mantras and benedictions), the Aranyakas (text on rituals, ceremonies, sacrifices and symbolic-sacrifices), the Brahmanas (commentaries on rituals, ceremonies and sacrifices), and the Upanishads (text discussing meditation, philosophy and spiritual knowledge). The first two parts of the Vedas were subsequently called the Karmakāṇḍa (ritualistic portion), while the last two form the Jñānakāṇḍa (knowledge portion, discussing spiritual insight and philosophical teachings).

The Upanishads are the foundation of Hindu philosophical thought and have profoundly influenced diverse traditions. Of the Shrutis (Vedic corpus), the Upanishads alone are widely influential among Hindus, considered scriptures par excellence of Hinduism, and their central ideas have continued to influence its thoughts and traditions. Indian philosopher Sarvepalli Radhakrishnan states that the Upanishads have played a dominating role ever since their appearance. There are 108 Muktikā Upanishads in Hinduism, of which between 10 and 13 are variously counted by scholars as Principal Upanishads.

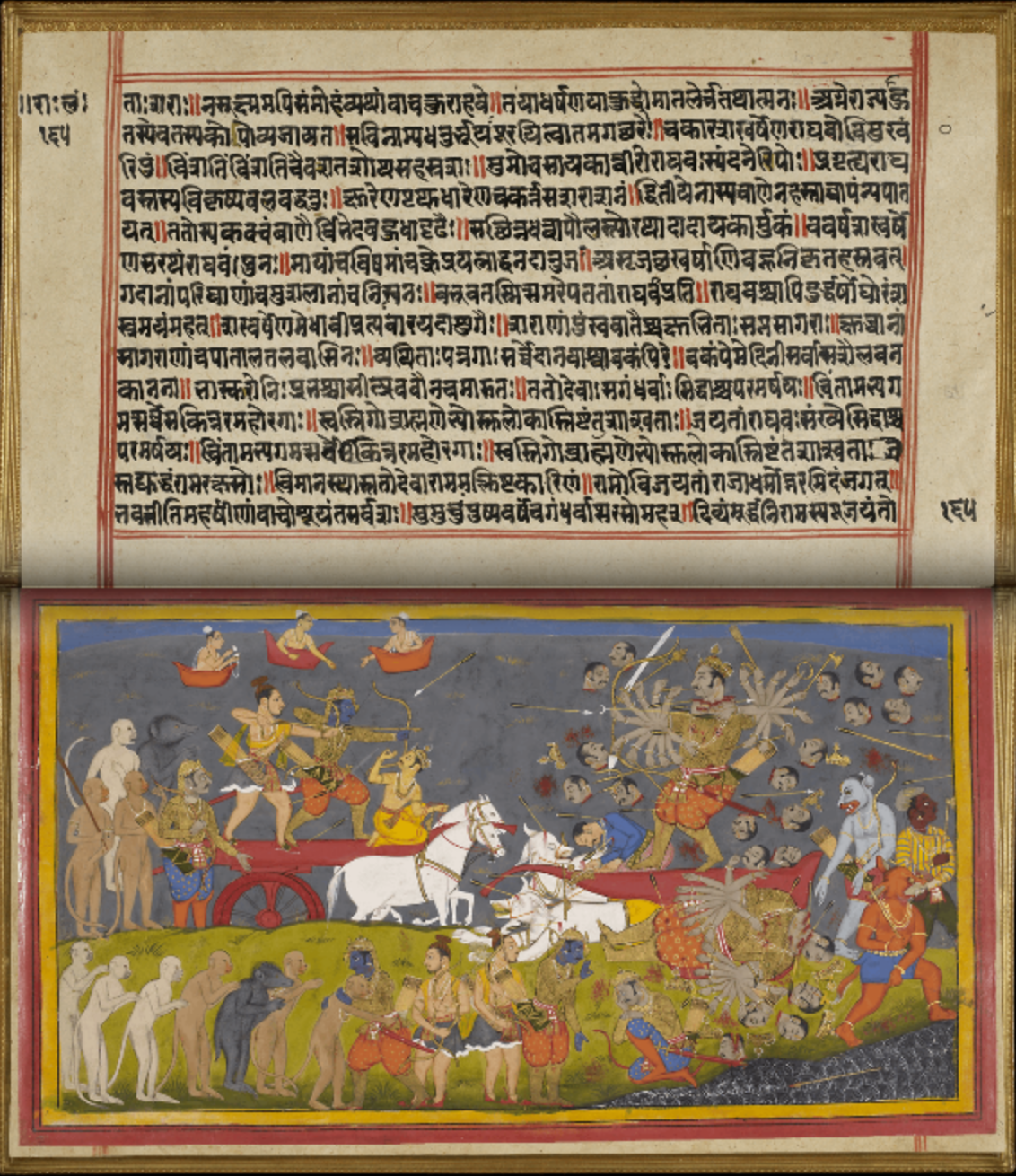
Ramayana

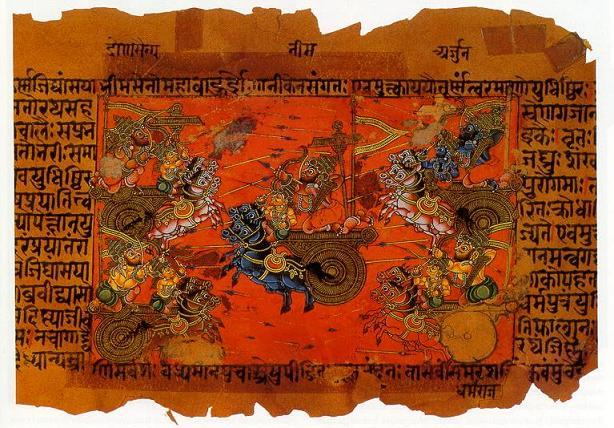
Mahabharata

The most notable of the Smritis (lit. 'that which is remembered') are the Hindu epics and the Puranas (lit. 'that which is ancient'). The epics consist of the Mahabharata and the Ramayana. The Bhagavad Gita is an integral part of the Mahabharata and one of the most popular sacred texts of Hinduism. It is sometimes called Gitopanishad, then placed in the Shruti ("heard") category, being Upanishadic in content. The Puranas, which started to be composed of c. 300 CE onward, contain extensive mythologies, and are central in the distribution of common themes of Hinduism through vivid narratives. The Yoga Sutras is a classical text for the Hindu Yoga tradition, which gained renewed popularity in the 20th century.

Since the 19th century, Indian modernists have re-asserted the 'Aryan origins' of Hinduism, "purifying" Hinduism from its Tantric elements and elevating the Vedic elements. Hindu modernists like Vivekananda see the Vedas as the laws of the spiritual world, which would still exist even if they were not revealed to the sages.

Tantra are the religious scriptures that give prominence to the female energy of the deity that in her personified form has both gentle and fierce form. In Tantric tradition, Radha, Parvati, Durga, and Kali are worshipped symbolically as well as in their personified forms. The Agamas in Tantra refer to authoritative scriptures or the teachings of Shiva to Shakti, while Nigamas refers to the Vedas and the teachings of Shakti to Shiva. In Agamic schools of Hinduism, the Vedic literature and the Agamas are equally authoritative.

== Beliefs ==
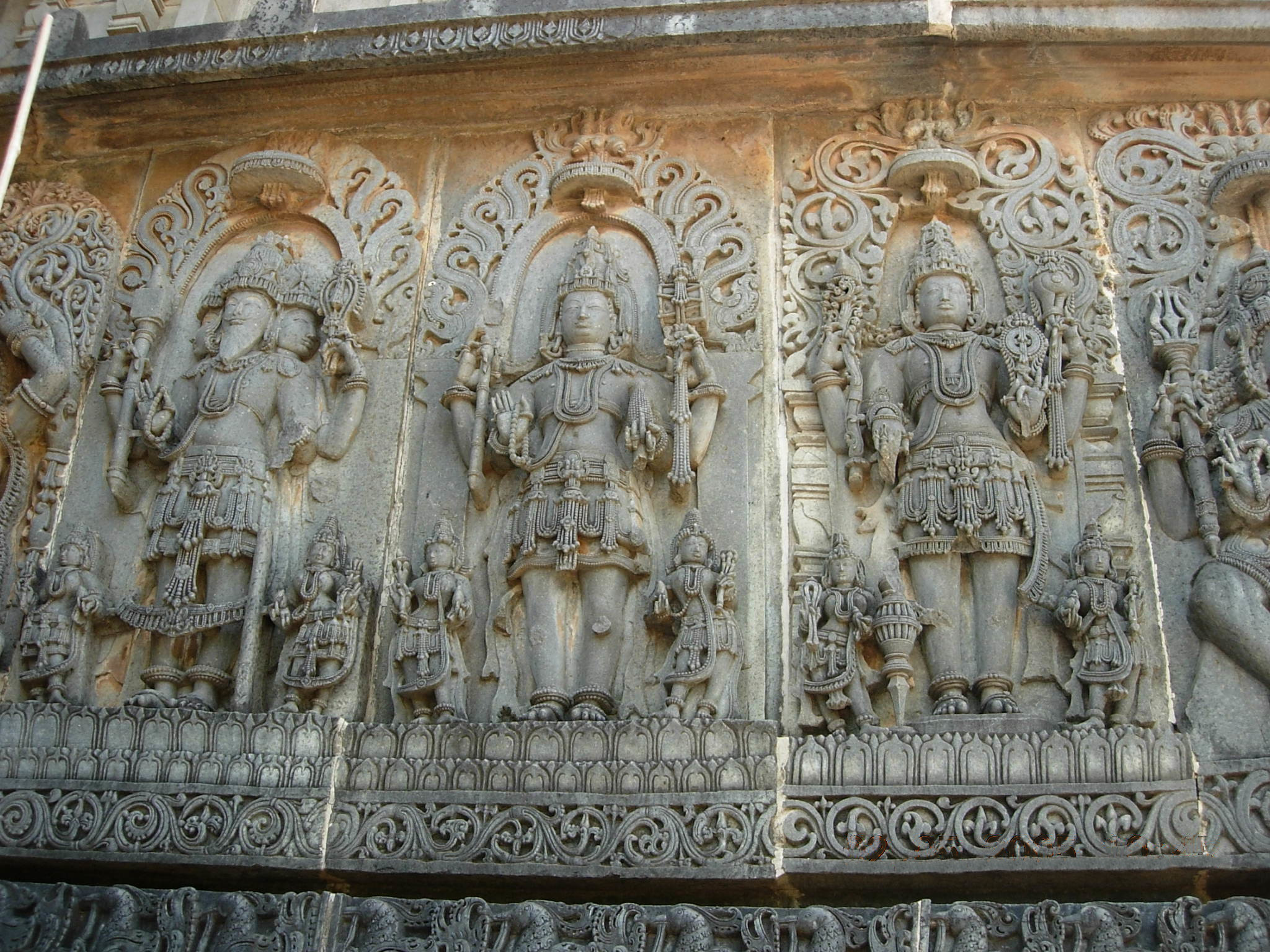
Temple wall panel relief sculpture at the Hoysaleswara Temple in Halebidu, representing the Trimurti: Brahma, Shiva and Vishnu

Prominent themes in Hindu beliefs include (but are not restricted to) Dharma (ethics/duties), Saṃsāra (the continuing cycle of entanglement in passions and the resulting birth, life, death, and rebirth), Karma (action, intent, and consequences), moksha (liberation from attachment and saṃsāra), and the various yogas (paths or practices). However, not all of these themes are found among the various different systems of Hindu beliefs. Beliefs in moksha or saṃsāra are absent in certain Hindu beliefs, and were also absent among early forms of Hinduism, which was characterised by a belief in an Afterlife, with traces of this still being found among various Hindu beliefs, such as Śrāddha. Ancestor worship once formed an integral part of Hindu beliefs and is today still found as an important element in various Folk Hindu streams.

=== Purusharthas ===
Purusharthas refers to the objectives of human life. Classical Hindu thought accepts four proper goals or aims of human life, known as Puruṣārthas – Dharma, Artha, Kama and Moksha.

==== Dharma (moral duties, righteousness, ethics) ====
Dharma is considered the foremost goal of a human being in Hinduism. The concept of dharma includes behaviours that are considered to be in accord with rta, the order that makes life and universe possible, and includes duties, rights, laws, conduct, virtues and "right way of living". Hindu dharma includes the religious duties, moral rights and duties of each individual, as well as behaviours that enable social order, right conduct, and those that are virtuous. Dharma is that which all existing beings must accept and respect to sustain harmony and order in the world. It is the pursuit and execution of one's nature and true calling, thus playing one's role in cosmic concert. The Brihadaranyaka Upanishad states it as:

Nothing is higher than Dharma. The weak overcomes the stronger by Dharma, as over a king. Truly that Dharma is the Truth (Satya); Therefore, when a man speaks the Truth, they say, "He speaks the Dharma"; and if he speaks Dharma, they say, "He speaks the Truth!" For both are one.

— Brihadaranyaka Upanishad, 1.4.xiv

In the Mahabharata, Krishna defines dharma as upholding both this-worldly and other-worldly affairs. (Mbh 12.110.11). The word Sanātana means eternal, perennial, or forever; thus, Sanātana Dharma signifies that it is the dharma that has neither beginning nor end. The nature of dharma is outlined and debated within the texts of the Dharmasastra tradition, of which the Manusmriti is considered to be the first.

==== Artha (the means or resources needed for a fulfilling life) ====
Artha is the virtuous pursuit of means, resources, assets, or livelihood, for the purpose of meeting obligations, economic prosperity, and to have a fulfilling life. It is inclusive of political life, diplomacy, and material well-being. The artha concept includes all "means of life", activities and resources that enables one to be in a state one wants to be in, wealth, career and financial security. The proper pursuit of artha is considered an important aim of human life in Hinduism.

A central premise of Hindu philosophy is that every person should live a joyous, pleasurable and fulfilling life, where every person's needs are acknowledged and fulfilled. A person's needs can only be fulfilled when sufficient means are available. Artha, then, is best described as the pursuit of the means necessary for a joyous, pleasurable and fulfilling life.

==== Kāma (sensory, emotional and aesthetic pleasure) ====
Kāma (Sanskrit, Pali: काम) means desire, wish, passion, longing, and pleasure of the senses, the aesthetic enjoyment of life, affection and love, with or without sexual connotations.

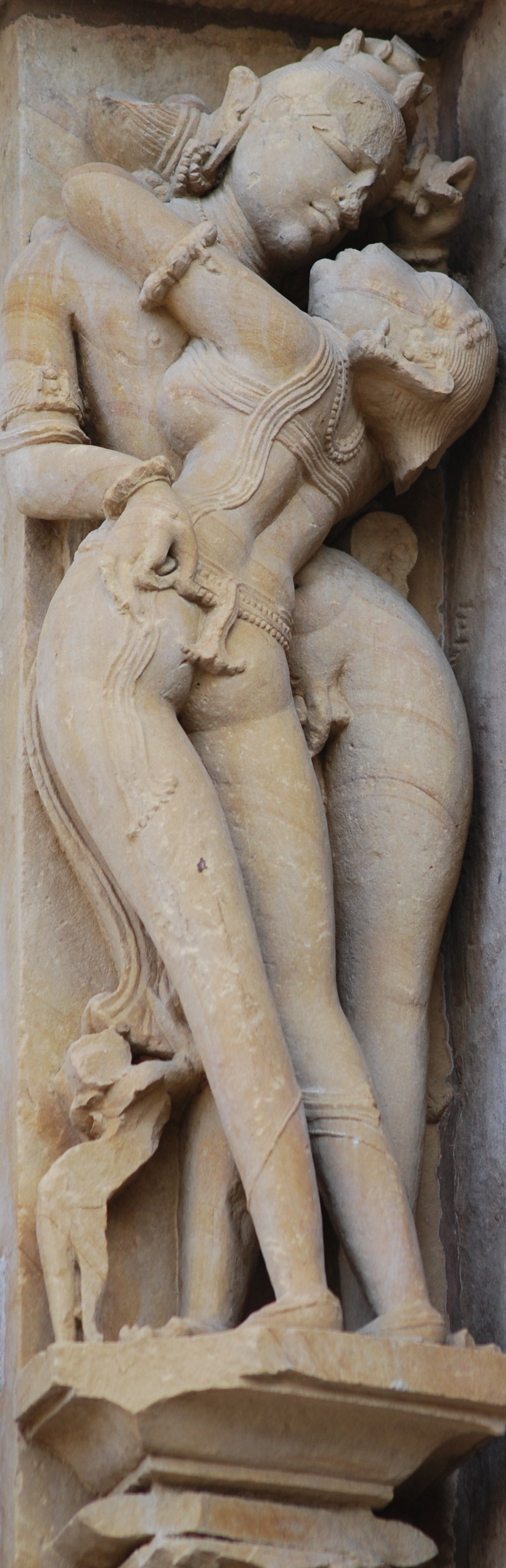
Tantric depiction of loving embrace at a temple relief of Khajuraho Group of Monuments, Madhya Pradesh, India – a UNESCO World Heritage Site

In contemporary Indian literature kama is often used to refer to sexual desire, but in ancient Indian literature kāma is expansive and includes any kind of enjoyment and pleasure, such as pleasure deriving from the arts. The ancient Indian Epic the Mahabharata describes kama as any agreeable and desirable experience generated by the interaction of one or more of the five senses with anything associated with that sense, when in harmony with the other goals of human life (dharma, artha and moksha).

In Hinduism, kama is considered an essential and healthy goal of human life when pursued without sacrificing dharma, artha and moksha.

==== Mokṣa (liberation, freedom from suffering) ====
Moksha (Sanskrit: मोक्ष, romanized: mokṣa) or mukti (Sanskrit: मुक्ति) is the ultimate, most important goal in Hinduism. Moksha is a concept associated with liberation from sorrow, suffering, and for many theistic schools of Hinduism, liberation from samsara (a birth-rebirth cycle). A release from this eschatological cycle in the afterlife is called moksha in theistic schools of Hinduism.

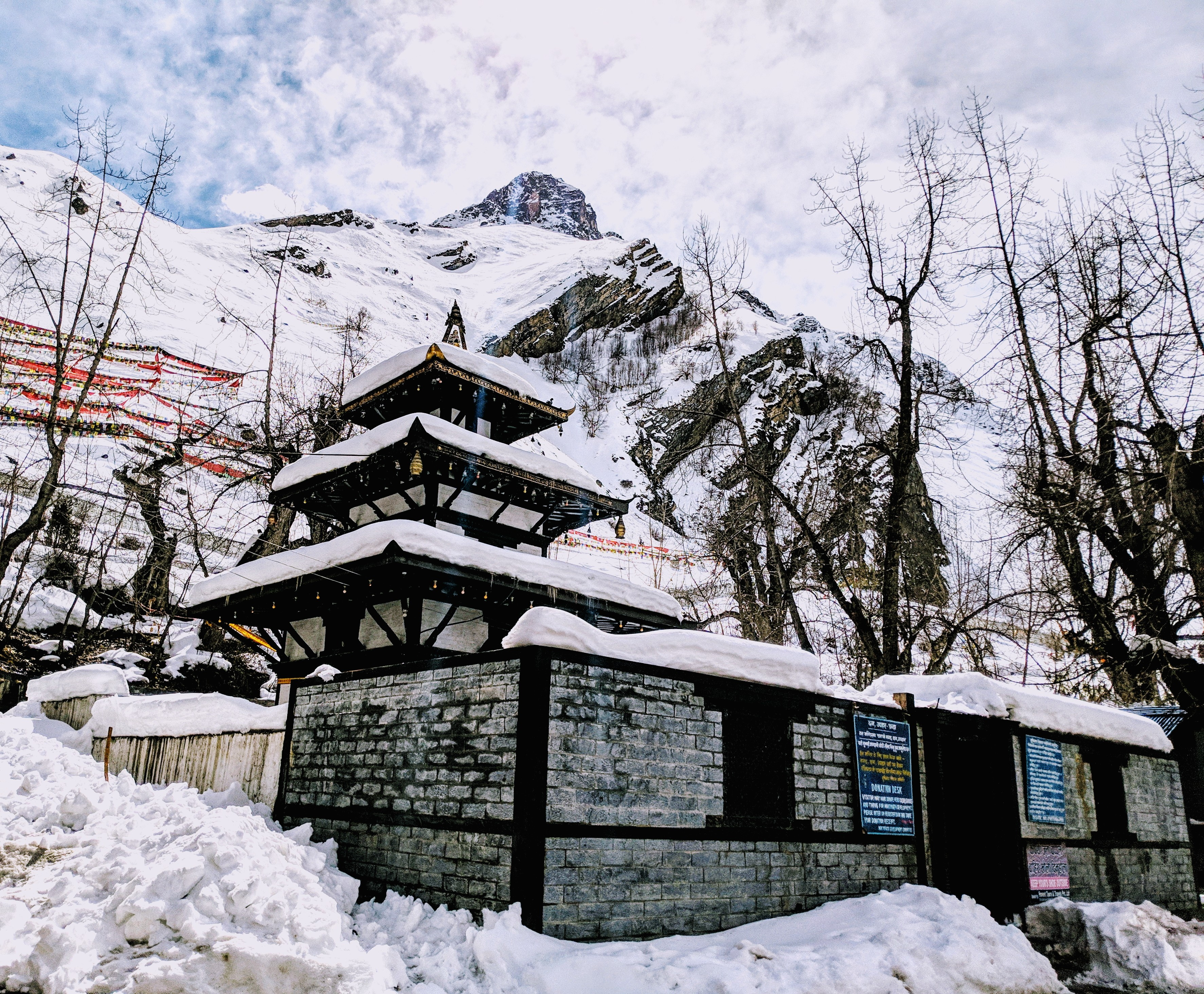
Muktinath temple in Mustang, Nepal, considered one of the focal pilgrimage places for liberation (moksha or nirvana)

Due to the belief in Hinduism that the Atman is eternal, and the concept of Purusha (the cosmic self or cosmic consciousness), death can be seen as insignificant in comparison to the eternal Atman or Purusha.

===== Differing views on the nature of moksha =====
The meaning of moksha differs among the various Hindu schools of thought.

Advaita Vedanta holds that upon attaining moksha a person knows their essence, or self, to be pure consciousness or the witness-consciousness and identifies it as identical to Brahman.

More generally, in the theistic schools of Hinduism moksha is usually seen as liberation from saṃsāra, while for other schools, such as the monistic school, moksha happens during a person's lifetime and is a psychological concept.

According to Deutsch, moksha is a transcendental consciousness of the perfect state of being, of self-realization, of freedom, and of "realizing the whole universe as the Self". Moksha when viewed as a psychological concept, suggests Klaus Klostermaier, implies a setting free of hitherto fettered faculties, a removing of obstacles to an unrestricted life, permitting a person to be more truly a person in the fullest sense. This concept presumes an unused human potential of creativity, compassion and understanding which had been previously blocked and shut out.

Due to these different views on the nature of moksha, the Vedantic school separates this into two views – Jivanmukti (liberation in this life) and Videhamukti (liberation after death).

=== Karma and saṃsāra ===
Karma translates literally as action, work, or deed, and also refers to a Vedic theory of "moral law of cause and effect". The theory is a combination of (1) causality that may be ethical or non-ethical; (2) ethicisation, that is good or bad actions have consequences; and (3) rebirth. Karma theory is interpreted as explaining the present circumstances of an individual with reference to their actions in the past. These actions and their consequences may be in a person's current life, or, according to some schools of Hinduism, in past lives. This cycle of birth, life, death and rebirth is called saṃsāra. Liberation from saṃsāra through moksha is believed to ensure lasting happiness and peace. Hindu scriptures teach that the future is both a function of current human effort derived from free will and past human actions that set the circumstances. The idea of reincarnation, or saṃsāra, is not mentioned in the early layers of historical Hindu texts such as the Rigveda. The later layers of the Rigveda do mention ideas that suggest an approach towards the idea of rebirth, according to Ranade. According to Sayers, these earliest layers of Hindu literature show ancestor worship and rites such as sraddha (offering food to the ancestors). The later Vedic texts such as the Aranyakas and the Upanisads show a different soteriology based on reincarnation, they show little concern with ancestor rites, and they begin to philosophically interpret the earlier rituals. The idea of reincarnation and karma have roots in the Upanishads of the late Vedic period, predating the Buddha and the Mahavira.

=== Concept of God ===
Hinduism is a diverse system of thought with a wide variety of beliefs its concept of God is complex and depends upon each individual and the tradition and philosophy followed. It is sometimes referred to as henotheistic (i.e., involving devotion to a single god while accepting the existence of others), but any such term is an overgeneralisation.

Who really knows?
Who will here proclaim it?
Whence was it produced? Whence is this creation?
The gods came afterwards, with the creation of this universe.
Who then knows whence it has arisen?

— Nasadiya Sukta, concerns the origin of the universe, Rigveda, 10:129–6

The Nasadiya Sukta (Creation Hymn) of the Rig Veda is one of the earliest texts which "demonstrates a sense of metaphysical speculation" about what created the universe, the concept of god(s) and The One, and whether even The One knows how the universe came into being. The Rig Veda praises various deities, none superior nor inferior, in a henotheistic manner. The hymns repeatedly refer to One Truth and One Ultimate Reality. The "One Truth" of Vedic literature, in modern era scholarship, has been interpreted as monotheism, monism, as well as a deified Hidden Principles behind the great happenings and processes of nature.

Gods and Goddesses in Hinduism

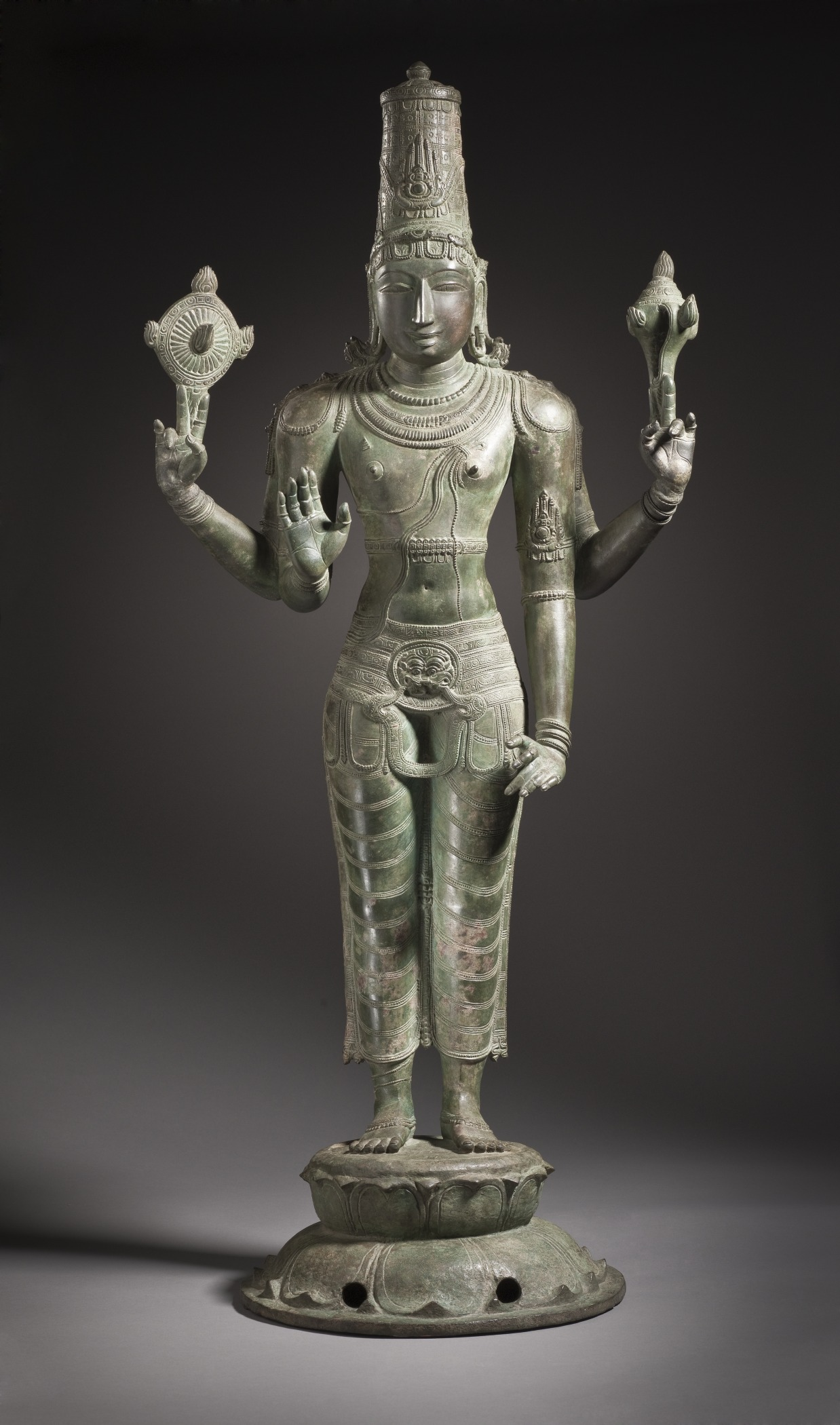
Vishnu

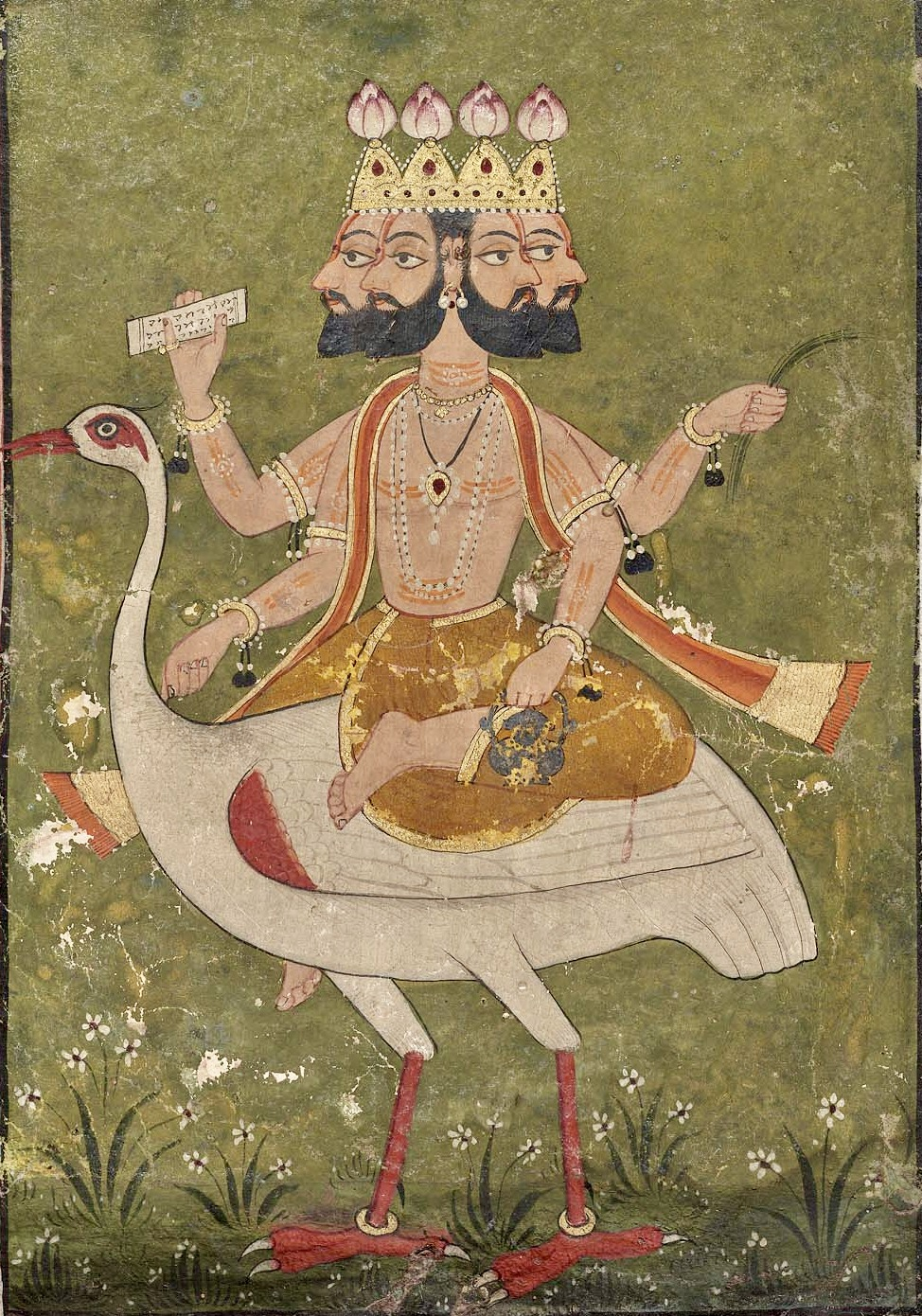
Brahma

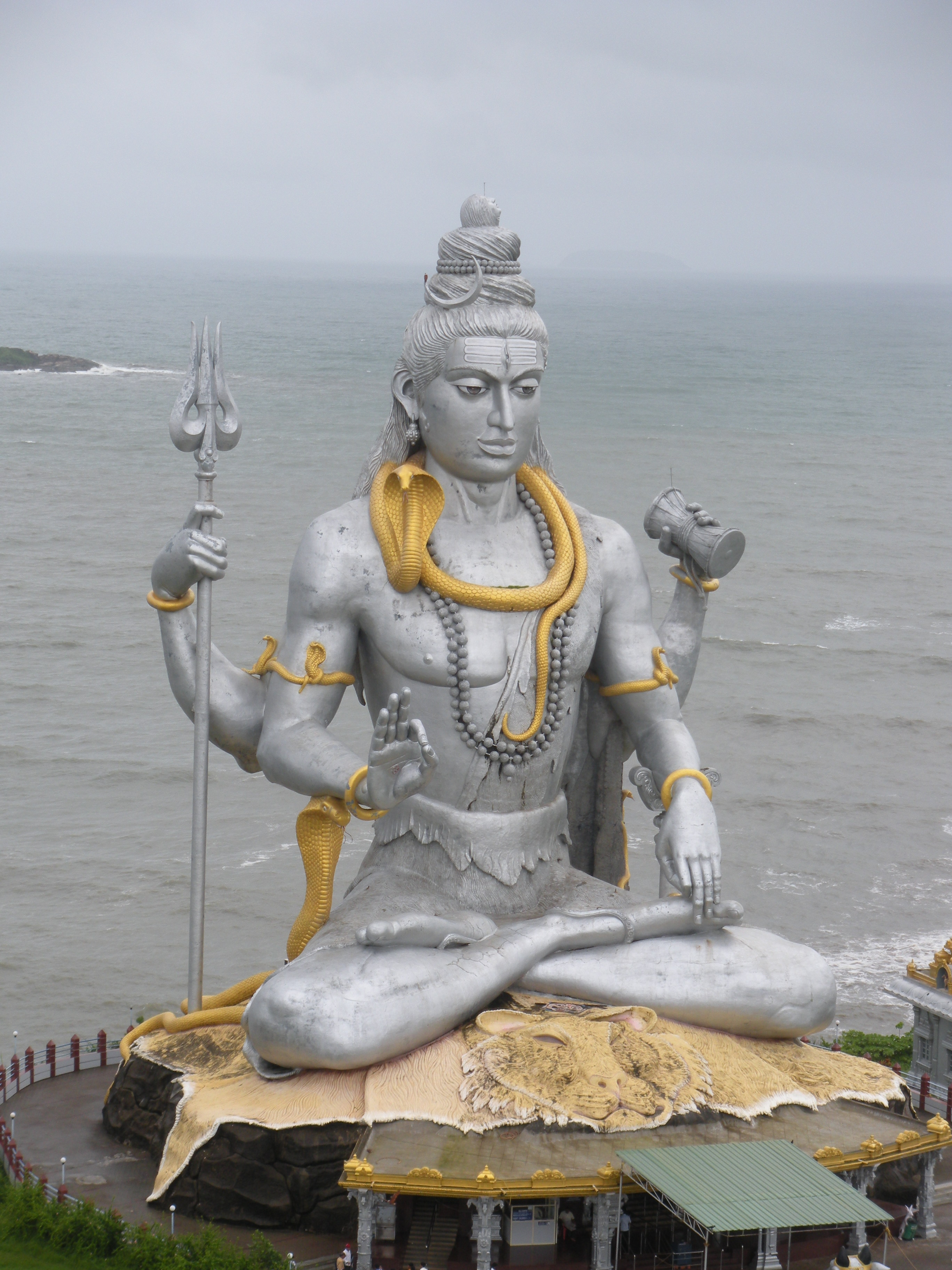
Shiva

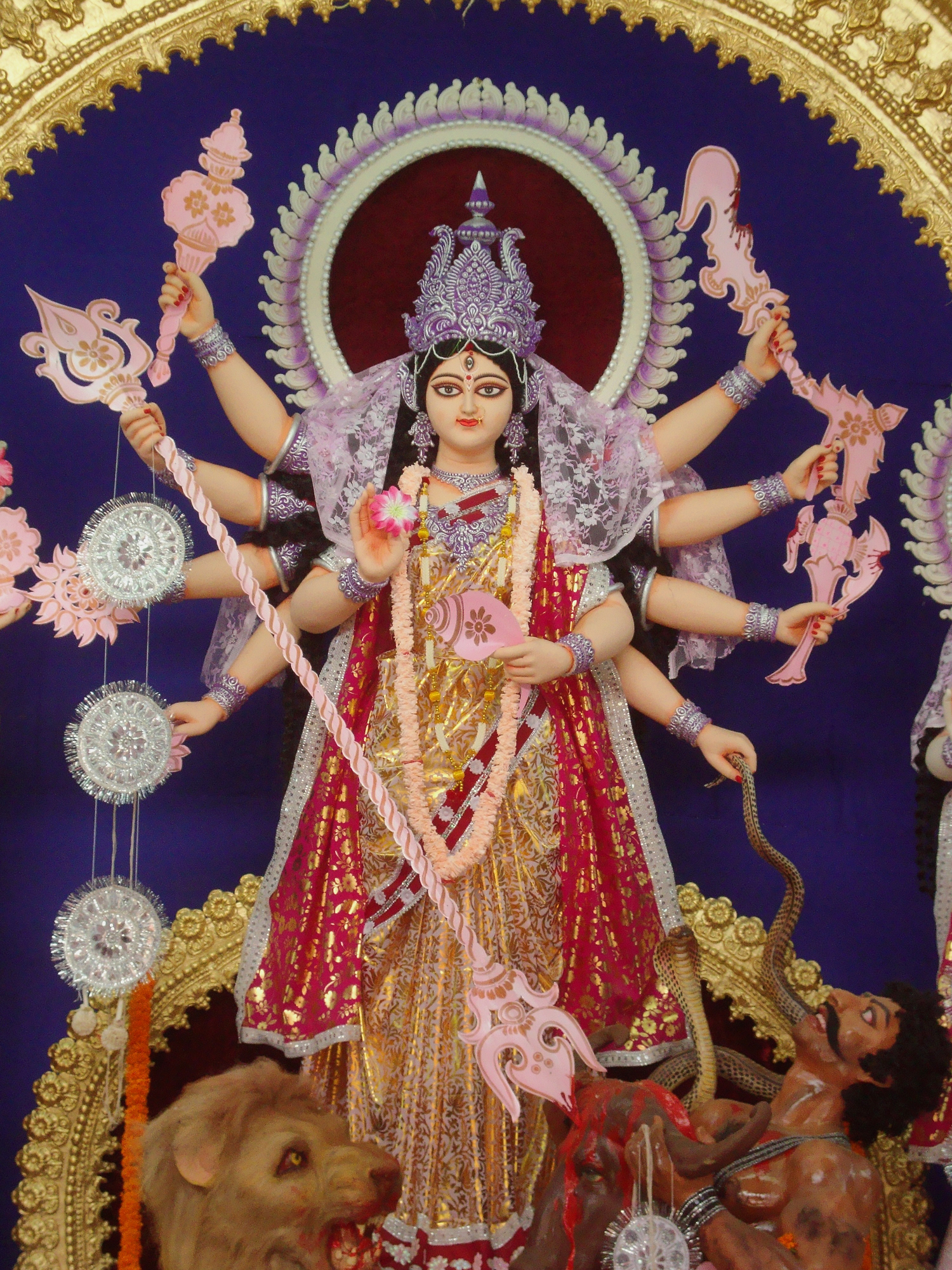
Shakti

Hindus believe that all living creatures have a Self. This true "Self" of every person, is called the ātman. The Self is believed to be eternal. According to the monistic/pantheistic (non-dualist) theologies of Hinduism (such as Advaita Vedanta school), this Atman is indistinct from Brahman, the supreme spirit or the Ultimate Reality. The goal of life, according to the Advaita school, is to realise that one's Self is identical to supreme Self, that the supreme Self is present in everything and everyone, all life is interconnected and there is oneness in all life. Dualistic schools (Dvaita and Bhakti) understand Brahman as a Supreme Being separate from individual Selfs. They worship the Supreme Being variously as Vishnu, Brahma, Shiva, or Shakti, depending upon the sect. God is called Ishvara, Bhagavan, Parameshwara, Deva or Devi, and these terms have different meanings in different schools of Hinduism.

Hindu texts accept a polytheistic framework, but this is generally conceptualised as the divine essence or luminosity that gives vitality and animation to the inanimate natural substances. There is a divine in everything, human beings, animals, trees and rivers. It is observable in offerings to rivers, trees, tools of one's work, animals and birds, rising sun, friends and guests, teachers and parents. It is the divine in these that makes each sacred and worthy of reverence, rather than them being sacred in and of themselves. This perception of divinity manifested in all things, as Buttimer and Wallin view it, makes the Vedic foundations of Hinduism quite distinct from animism, in which all things are themselves divine. The animistic premise sees multiplicity, and therefore an equality of ability to compete for power when it comes to man and man, man and animal, man and nature, etc. The Vedic view does not perceive this competition, equality of man to nature, or multiplicity so much as an overwhelming and interconnecting single divinity that unifies everyone and everything.

The Hindu scriptures name celestial entities called Devas (or Devi in feminine form), which may be translated into English as gods or heavenly beings. (Note: For translation of deva in singular noun form as "a deity, god", and in plural form as "the gods" or "the heavenly or shining ones", see: Monier-Williams 2001, p. 492. For translation of devatā as "godhead, divinity", see: Monier-Williams 2001, p. 495.) The devas are an integral part of Hindu culture and are depicted in art, architecture and through icons, and stories about them are related in the scriptures, particularly in Indian epic poetry and the Puranas. They are, however, often distinguished from Ishvara, a personal god, with many Hindus worshipping Ishvara in one of its particular manifestations as their iṣṭa devatā, or chosen ideal. The choice is a matter of individual preference, and of regional and family traditions. (Note: Among some regional Hindus, such as Rajputs, these are called Kuldevis or Kuldevata.) The multitude of Devas is considered manifestations of Brahman.

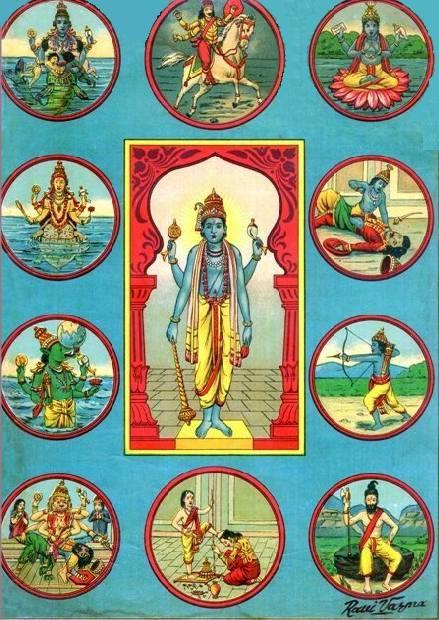
Hindu god Vishnu (centre) surrounded by his ten major avatars, namely Matsya; Kurma; Varaha; Narasimha; Vamana; Parashurama; Rama; Krishna; Buddha, and Kalki

The word avatar does not appear in the Vedic literature; It appears in verb forms in post-Vedic literature, and as a noun particularly in the Puranic literature after the 6th century CE. Theologically, the reincarnation idea is most often associated with the avatars of Hindu god Vishnu, though the idea has been applied to other deities. Varying lists of avatars of Vishnu appear in Hindu scriptures, including the ten Dashavatara of the Garuda Purana and the twenty-two avatars in the Bhagavata Purana, though the latter adds that the incarnations of Vishnu are innumerable. The avatars of Vishnu are important in Vaishnavism theology. In the goddess-based Shaktism tradition, avatars of the Devi are found and all goddesses are considered to be different aspects of the same metaphysical Brahman and Shakti (energy). While avatars of other deities such as Ganesha and Shiva are also mentioned in medieval Hindu texts, this is minor and occasional.

Both theistic and atheistic ideas, for epistemological and metaphysical reasons, are profuse in different schools of Hinduism. The early Nyaya school of Hinduism, for example, was non-theist/atheist, but later Nyaya school scholars argued that God exists and offered proofs using its theory of logic. Other schools disagreed with Nyaya scholars. Samkhya, Mimamsa and Carvaka schools of Hinduism, were non-theist/atheist, arguing that "God was an unnecessary metaphysical assumption". (Note: Sāṁkhyapravacana Sūtra I.92.) Its Vaisheshika school started as another non-theistic tradition relying on naturalism and that all matter is eternal, but it later introduced the concept of a non-creator God. The Yoga school of Hinduism accepted the concept of a "personal god" and left it to the Hindu to define their god. Advaita Vedanta taught a monistic, abstract Self and Oneness in everything, with no room for gods or deity, a perspective that Mohanty calls, "spiritual, not religious". Bhakti sub-schools of Vedanta taught a creator God that is distinct from each human being.

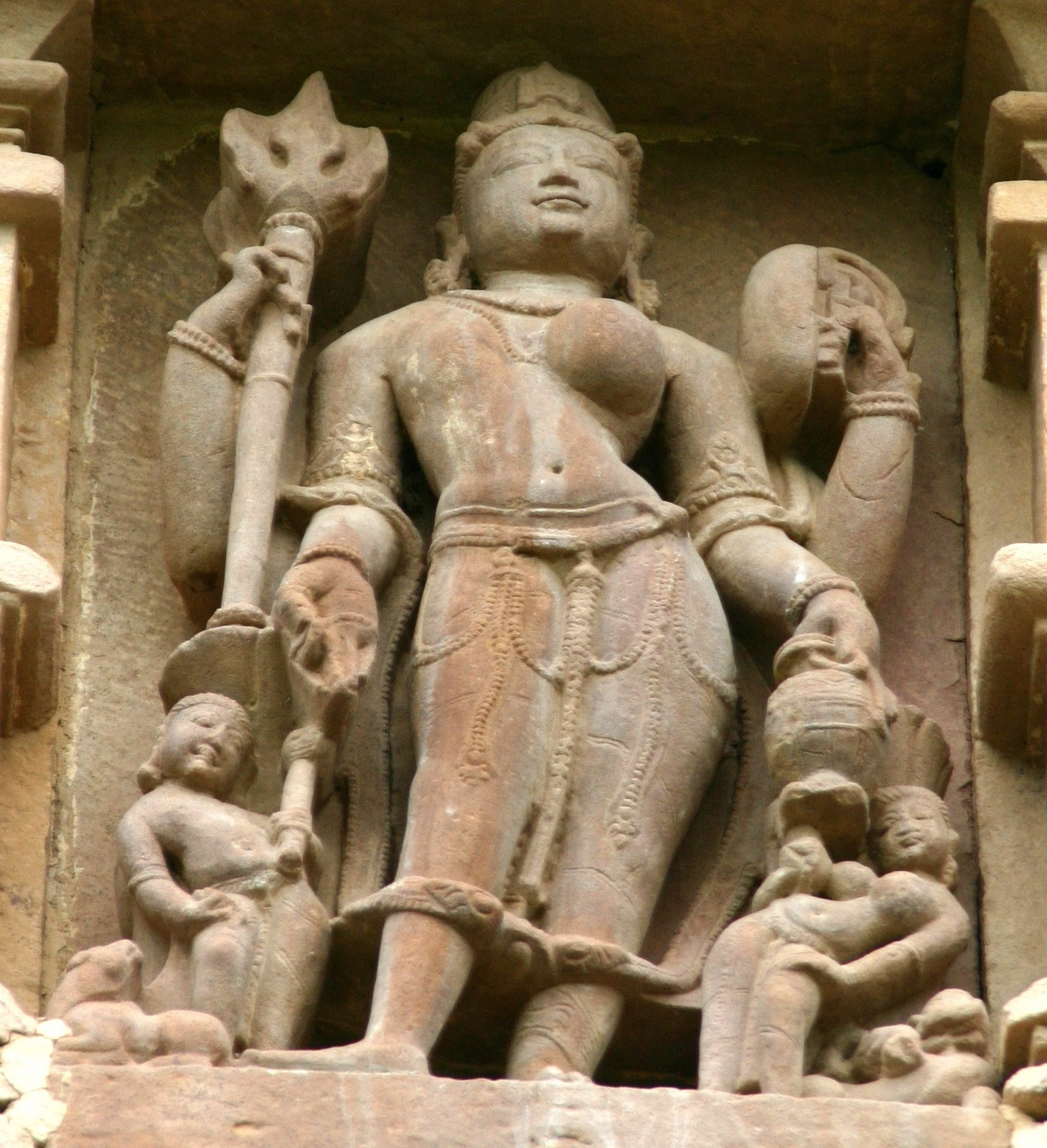
Ardhanarishvara, showing both feminine and masculine aspect of god in Hinduism

God in Hinduism is often represented having both the feminine and masculine aspects. The notion of the feminine in deity is much more pronounced and is evident in the pairings of Shiva with Parvati (Ardhanarishvara), Vishnu accompanied by Lakshmi, Radha with Krishna and Sita with Rama.

According to Graham Schweig, Hinduism has the strongest presence of the divine feminine in world religion from ancient times to the present. The goddess is viewed as the heart of the most esoteric Saiva traditions.

=== Authority ===
Authority and eternal truths play an important role in Hinduism. Religious traditions and truths are believed to be contained in its sacred texts, which are accessed and taught by sages, gurus, saints or avatars. But there is also a strong tradition of the questioning of authority, internal debate and challenging of religious texts in Hinduism. The Hindus believe that this deepens the understanding of the eternal truths and further develops the tradition. Authority "was mediated through [...] an intellectual culture that tended to develop ideas collaboratively, and according to the shared logic of natural reason." Narratives in the Upanishads present characters questioning persons of authority. The Kena Upanishad repeatedly asks kena, 'by what' power something is the case. The Katha Upanishad and Bhagavad Gita present narratives where the student criticises the teacher's inferior answers. In the Shiva Purana, Shiva questions Vishnu and Brahma. Doubt plays a repeated role in the Mahabharata. Jayadeva's Gita Govinda presents criticism via Radha.

Titles such as Guru, Acharya, or Mahacharya may be used to remark authority in Hindu and yogic traditions.

== Practices ==
Practices in Hinduism include worship at home, at temples, and at sacred places such as rivers, mountains, etc. The underpinning of Hindu worship is bhakti, or loving devotion to God. Worship includes practices such as puja, arti, and havan.

=== Rituals at home ===
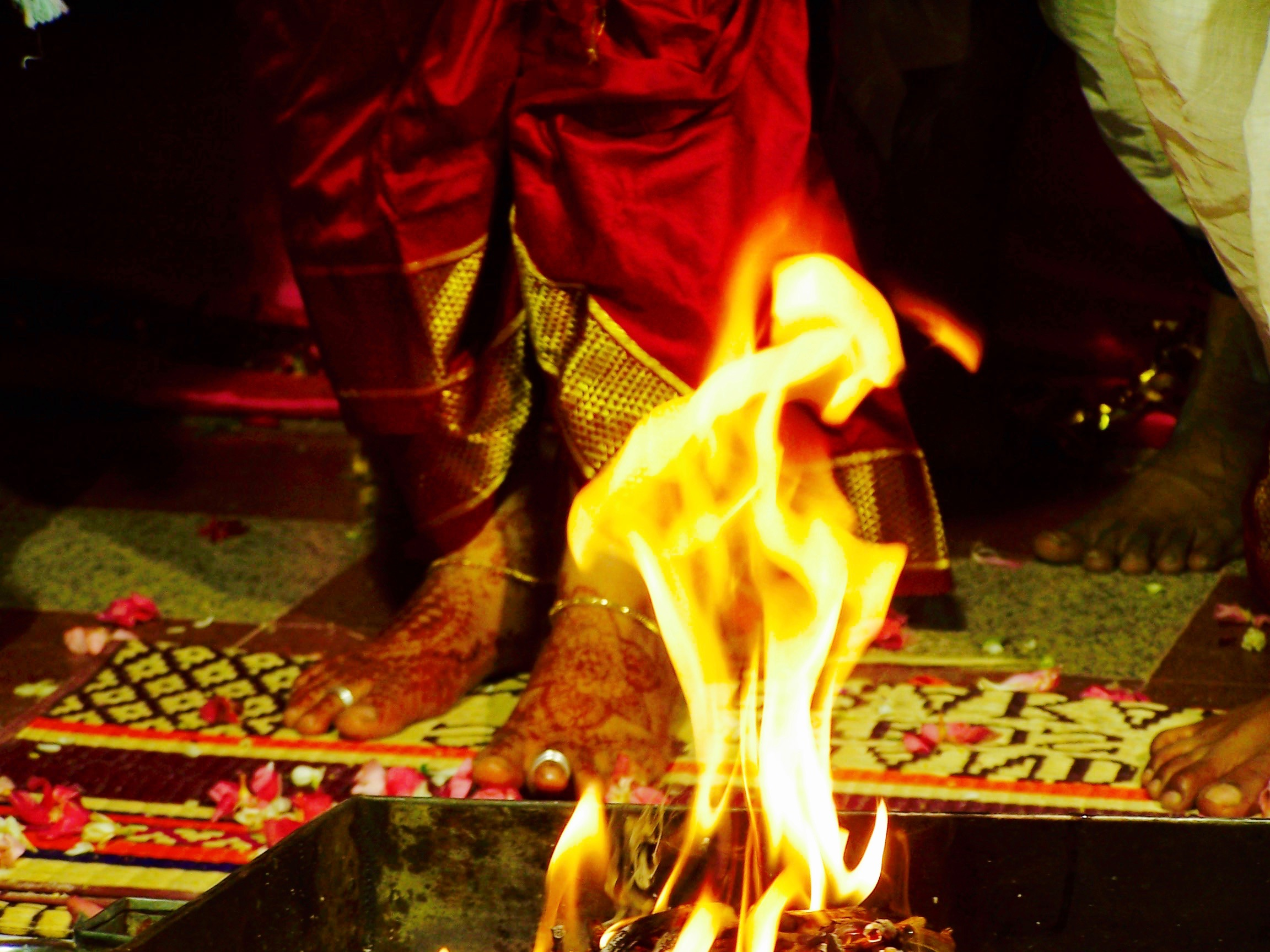
A wedding is the most extensive personal ritual an adult Hindu undertakes in their life. A typical Hindu wedding is solemnised before Vedic fire ritual (shown).

Most Hindus observe religious rituals at home. The rituals vary greatly among regions, villages, and individuals. They are not mandatory in Hinduism. The nature and place of rituals is an individual's choice. Some devout Hindus perform daily rituals such as worshiping at dawn after bathing (usually at a family shrine, and typically includes lighting a lamp and offering foodstuffs before the images of deities), recitation from religious scripts, singing bhajans (devotional hymns), yoga, meditation, chanting mantras and others.

=== Yajna ===
Vedic rituals of fire-oblation (yajna) and chanting of Vedic hymns are observed on special occasions, such as a Hindu wedding. Other major life-stage events, such as rituals after death, include the yajña and chanting of Vedic mantras.

The words of the mantras are "themselves sacred," and "do not constitute linguistic utterances." Instead, as Klostermaier notes, in their application in Vedic rituals they become magical sounds, "means to an end." (Note: Klostermaier: "Brahman, derived from the root bŗh = to grow, to become great, was originally identical with the Vedic word, that makes people prosper: words were the pricipan means to approach the gods who dwelled in a different sphere. It was not a big step from this notion of "reified speech-act" to that "of the speech-act being looked at implicitly and explicitly as a means to an end." Klostermaier 2007, p. 55 quotes Madhav M. Deshpande (1990), Changing Conceptions of the Veda: From Speech-Acts to Magical Sounds, p.4.) In the Brahmanical perspective, the sounds have their own meaning, mantras are considered "primordial rhythms of creation", preceding the forms to which they refer. By reciting them the cosmos is regenerated, "by enlivening and nourishing the forms of creation at their base. As long as the purity of the sounds is preserved, the recitation of the mantras will be efficacious, irrespective of whether their discursive meaning is understood by human beings."

=== Sādhanā ===
Sādhanā is derived from the root "sādh-", meaning "to accomplish", and denotes a means for the realisation of spiritual goals. Although different denominations of Hinduism have their own particular notions of sādhana, they share the feature of liberation from bondage. They differ on what causes bondage, how one can become free of that bondage, and who or what can lead one on that path.

=== Life-cycle rites of passage ===
Major life stage milestones are celebrated as sanskara (saṃskāra, rites of passage) in Hinduism. The rites of passage are not mandatory, and vary in details by gender, community and regionally. Gautama Dharmasutras composed in about the middle of 1st millennium BCE lists 48 sanskaras, while Gryhasutra and other texts composed centuries later list between 12 and 16 sanskaras. The list of sanskaras in Hinduism include both external rituals such as those marking a baby's birth and a baby's name giving ceremony, as well as inner rites of resolutions and ethics such as compassion towards all living beings and positive attitude.

The major traditional rites of passage in Hinduism include Garbhadhana (pregnancy), Pumsavana (rite before the fetus begins moving and kicking in womb), Simantonnayana (parting of pregnant woman's hair, baby shower), Jatakarman (rite celebrating the new born baby), Namakarana (naming the child), Nishkramana (baby's first outing from home into the world), Annaprashana (baby's first feeding of solid food), Chudakarana (baby's first haircut, tonsure), Karnavedha (ear piercing), Vidyarambha (baby's start with knowledge), Upanayana (entry into a school rite), Keshanta and Ritusuddhi (first shave for boys, menarche for girls), Samavartana (graduation ceremony), Vivaha (wedding), Vratas (fasting, spiritual studies) and Antyeshti (cremation for an adult, burial for a child). In contemporary times, there is regional variation among Hindus as to which of these sanskaras are observed; in some cases, additional regional rites of passage such as Śrāddha (ritual of feeding people after cremation) are practised.

=== Bhakti (worship) ===
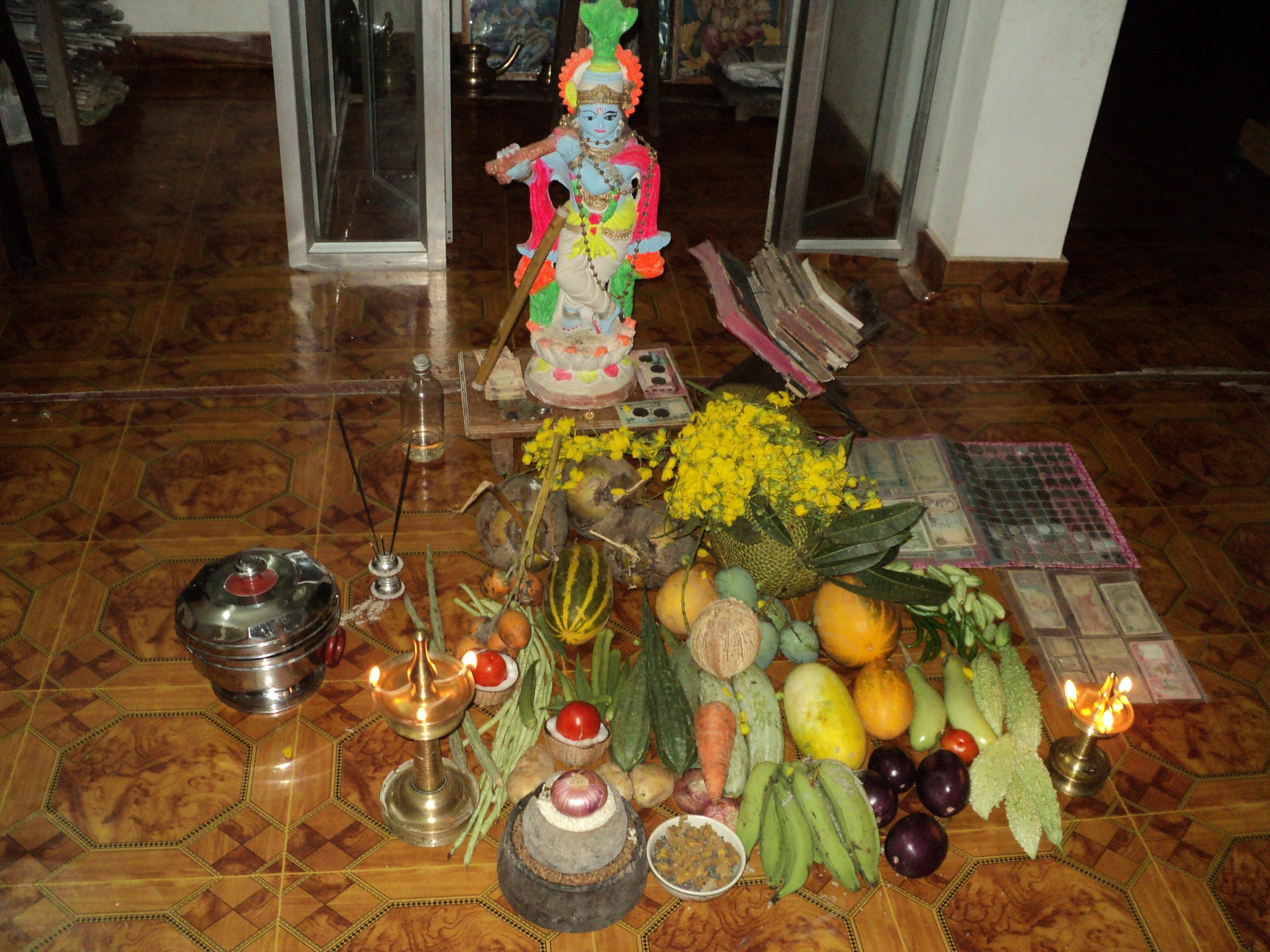
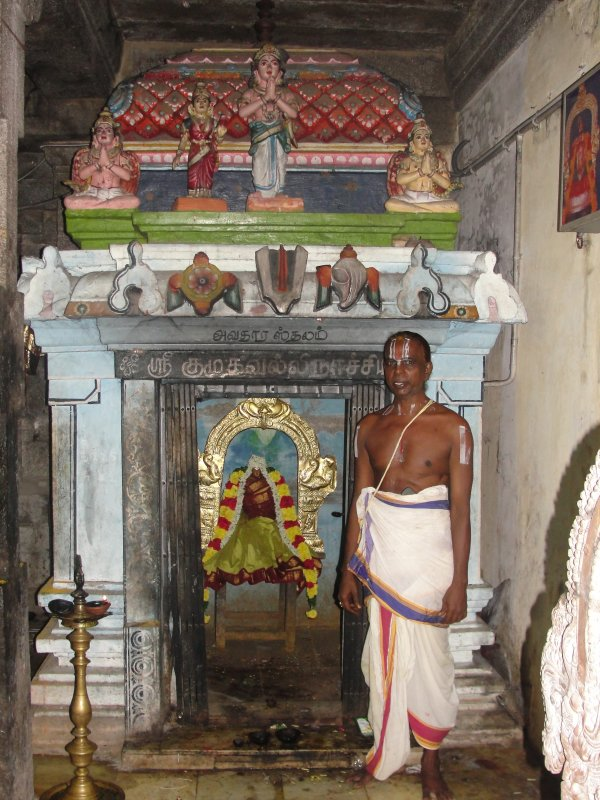
A home shrine with offerings at a regional Vishu festival (left); a priest in a temple (right)

Bhakti refers to devotion, participation in and the love of a personal god or a representational god by a devotee. Bhakti-marga is considered in Hinduism to be one of many possible paths of spirituality and alternative means to moksha. The other paths, left to the choice of a Hindu, are Jnana-marga (path of knowledge), Karma-marga (path of works), Rāja-marga (path of contemplation and meditation).

Bhakti is practised in a number of ways, ranging from reciting mantras, japas (incantations), to individual private prayers in one's home shrine, or in a temple before a murti or sacred image of a deity. Hindu temples and domestic altars, are important elements of worship in contemporary theistic Hinduism. While many visit a temple on special occasions, most offer daily prayers at a domestic altar, typically a dedicated part of the home that includes sacred images of deities or gurus.

One form of daily worship is aarati, or "supplication", a ritual in which a flame is offered and "accompanied by a song of praise". Notable aaratis include Om Jai Jagdish Hare, a Hindi prayer to Vishnu, and Sukhakarta Dukhaharta, a Marathi prayer to Ganesha. Aarti can be used to make offerings to entities ranging from deities to "human exemplar[s]". For instance, Aarti is offered to Hanuman, a devotee of God, in many temples where the primary deity is an incarnation of Vishnu. In Swaminarayan temples and home shrines, aarati is offered to Swaminarayan, considered by followers to be Supreme God.

Other personal and community practices include puja as well as aarati, kirtan, or bhajan, where devotional verses and hymns are read or poems are sung by a group of devotees. While the choice of the deity is at the discretion of the Hindu, the most observed traditions of Hindu devotion include Vaishnavism, Shaivism, and Shaktism. A Hindu may worship multiple deities, all as henotheistic manifestations of the same ultimate reality, cosmic spirit and absolute spiritual concept called Brahman. Bhakti-marga, states Pechelis, is more than ritual devotionalism, it includes practices and spiritual activities aimed at refining one's state of mind, knowing god, participating in god, and internalising god. While bhakti practices are popular and easily observable aspect of Hinduism, not all Hindus practice bhakti, or believe in god-with-attributes (saguna Brahman). Concurrent Hindu practices include a belief in god-without-attributes (nirguna Brahman), and god within oneself.

=== Festivals ===
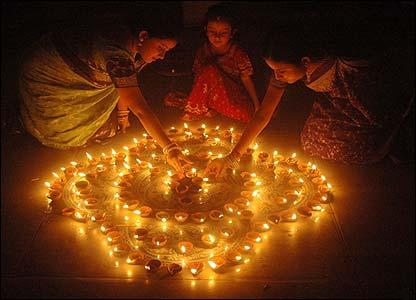
The festival of lights, Diwali, is celebrated by Hindus all over the world.

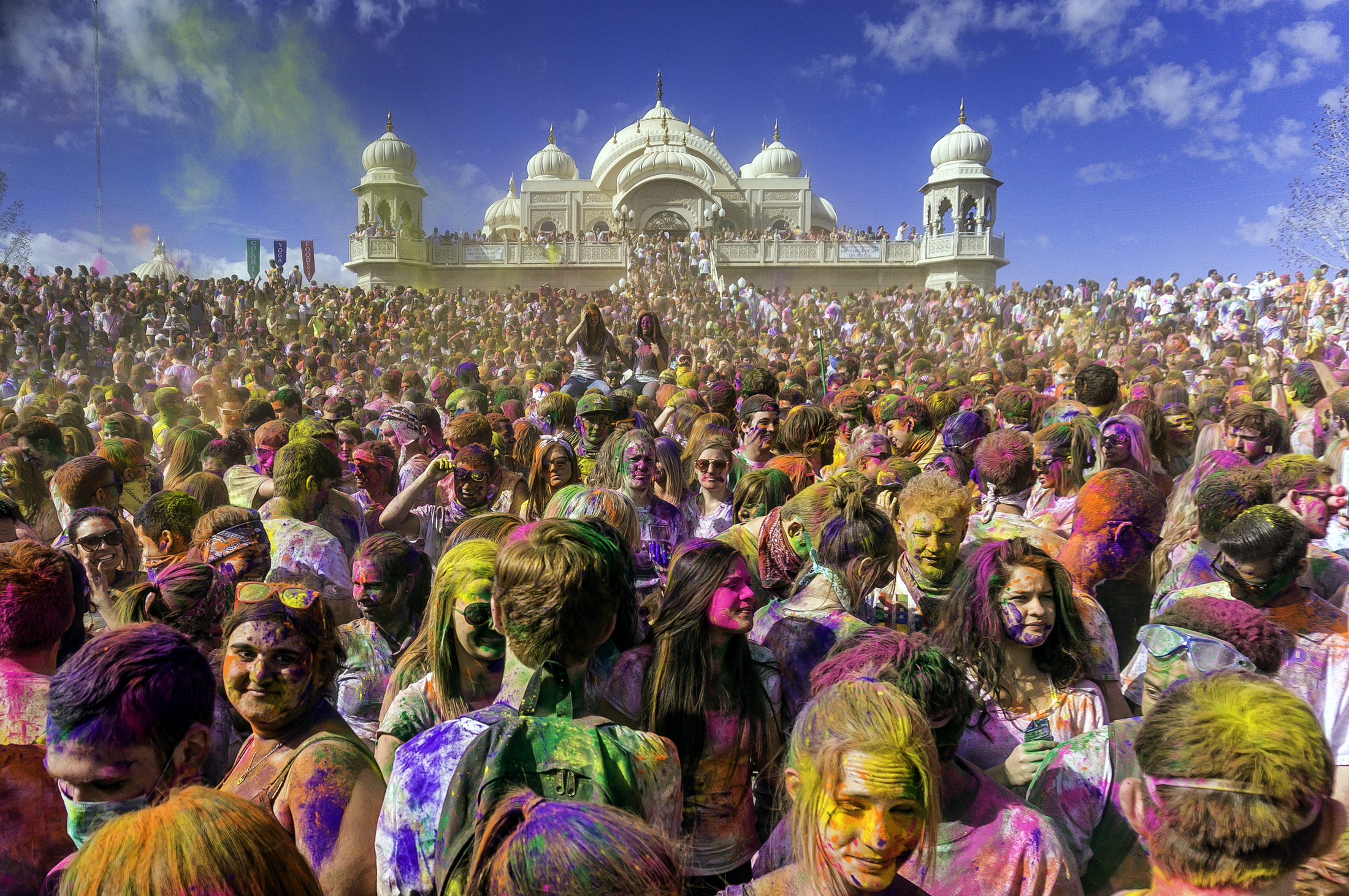
Holi being celebrated at the Sri Sri Radha Krishna Temple in Utah, United States

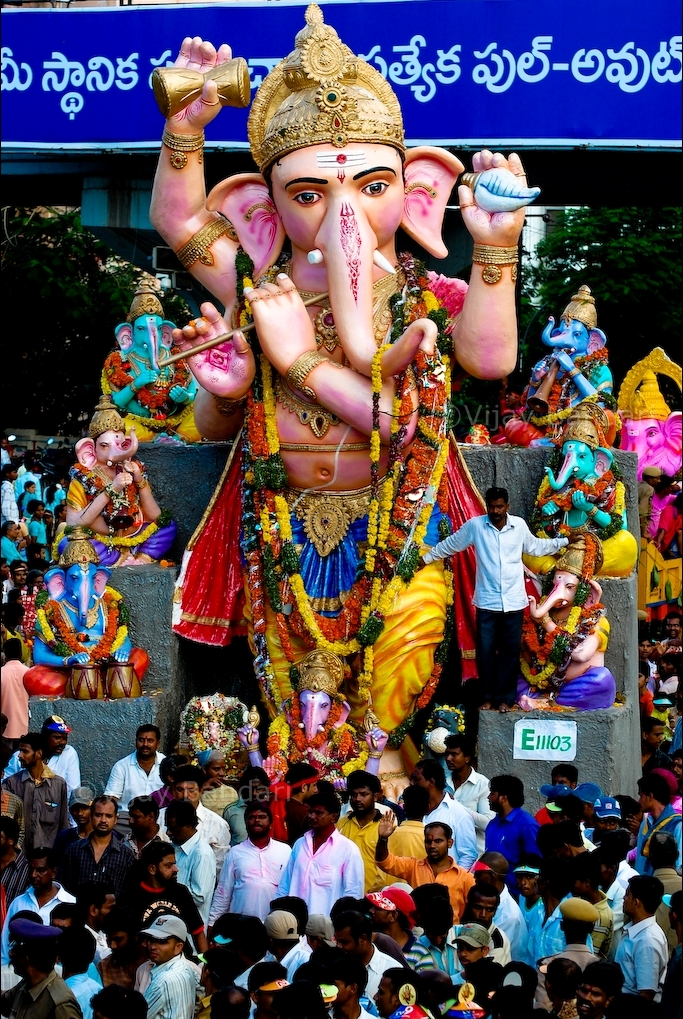
Hindus celebrating Ganesh Chaturti in Hyderabad, India

Hindu festivals (Sanskrit: Utsava; literally: "to lift higher") are ceremonies that weave individual and social life to dharma. Hinduism has many festivals throughout the year, where the dates are set by the lunisolar Hindu calendar, many coinciding with either the full moon (Holi) or the new moon (Diwali), often with seasonal changes. Some festivals are found only regionally and they celebrate local traditions, while a few such as Holi and Diwali are pan-Hindu. The festivals typically celebrate events from Hinduism, connoting spiritual themes and celebrating aspects of human relationships such as the sister-brother bond over the Raksha Bandhan (or Bhai Dooj) festival. The same festival sometimes marks different stories depending on the Hindu denomination, and the celebrations incorporate regional themes, traditional agriculture, local arts, family get togethers, Puja rituals and feasts.

Some major regional or pan-Hindu festivals include:

- Ashadhi Ekadashi
- Bonalu
- Chhath
- Dashain
- Diwali or Tihar or Deepawali
- Durga Puja
- Dussehra
- Ganesh Chaturthi
- Gowri Habba
- Gudi Padwa
- Holi
- Karva Chauth
- Kartika Purnima
- Krishna Janmashtami
- Maha Shivaratri
- Makar Sankranti
- Navaratri
- Onam
- Pongal
- Radhashtami
- Raksha Bandhan
- Rama Navami
- Ratha Yatra
- Sharad Purnima
- Shigmo
- Thaipusam
- Ugadi
- Vasant Panchami
- Vishu

=== Pilgrimage ===
Many adherents undertake pilgrimages, which have historically been an important part of Hinduism and remain so today. Pilgrimage sites are called Tirtha, Kshetra, Gopitha or Mahalaya. The process or journey associated with Tirtha is called Tirtha-yatra. According to the Hindu text Skanda Purana, Tirtha are of three kinds: Jangam Tirtha is to a place movable of a sadhu, a rishi, a guru; Sthawar Tirtha is to a place immovable, like Benaras, Haridwar, Mount Kailash, holy rivers; while Manas Tirtha is to a place of mind of truth, charity, patience, compassion, soft speech, Self. Tīrtha-yatra is, states Knut A. Jacobsen, anything that has a salvific value to a Hindu, and includes pilgrimage sites such as mountains or forests or seashore or rivers or ponds, as well as virtues, actions, studies or state of mind.

Pilgrimage sites of Hinduism are mentioned in the epic Mahabharata and the Puranas. Most Puranas include large sections on Tirtha Mahatmya along with tourist guides, which describe sacred sites and places to visit. In these texts, Varanasi (Benares, Kashi), Rameswaram, Kanchipuram, Dwarka, Puri, Haridwar, Sri Rangam, Vrindavan, Ayodhya, Tirupati, Mayapur, Nathdwara, twelve Jyotirlinga and Shakti Pitha have been mentioned as particularly holy sites, along with geographies where major rivers meet (sangam) or join the sea. Kumbh Mela is another major pilgrimage on the eve of the solar festival Makar Sankranti. This pilgrimage rotates at a gap of three years among four sites: Prayagraj at the confluence of the Ganges and Yamuna rivers, Haridwar near source of the Ganges, Ujjain on the Shipra river and Nashik on the bank of the Godavari river. This is one of world's largest mass pilgrimage, with an estimated 40 to 100 million people attending the event. At this event, they say a prayer to the sun and bathe in the river, a tradition attributed to Adi Shankara.

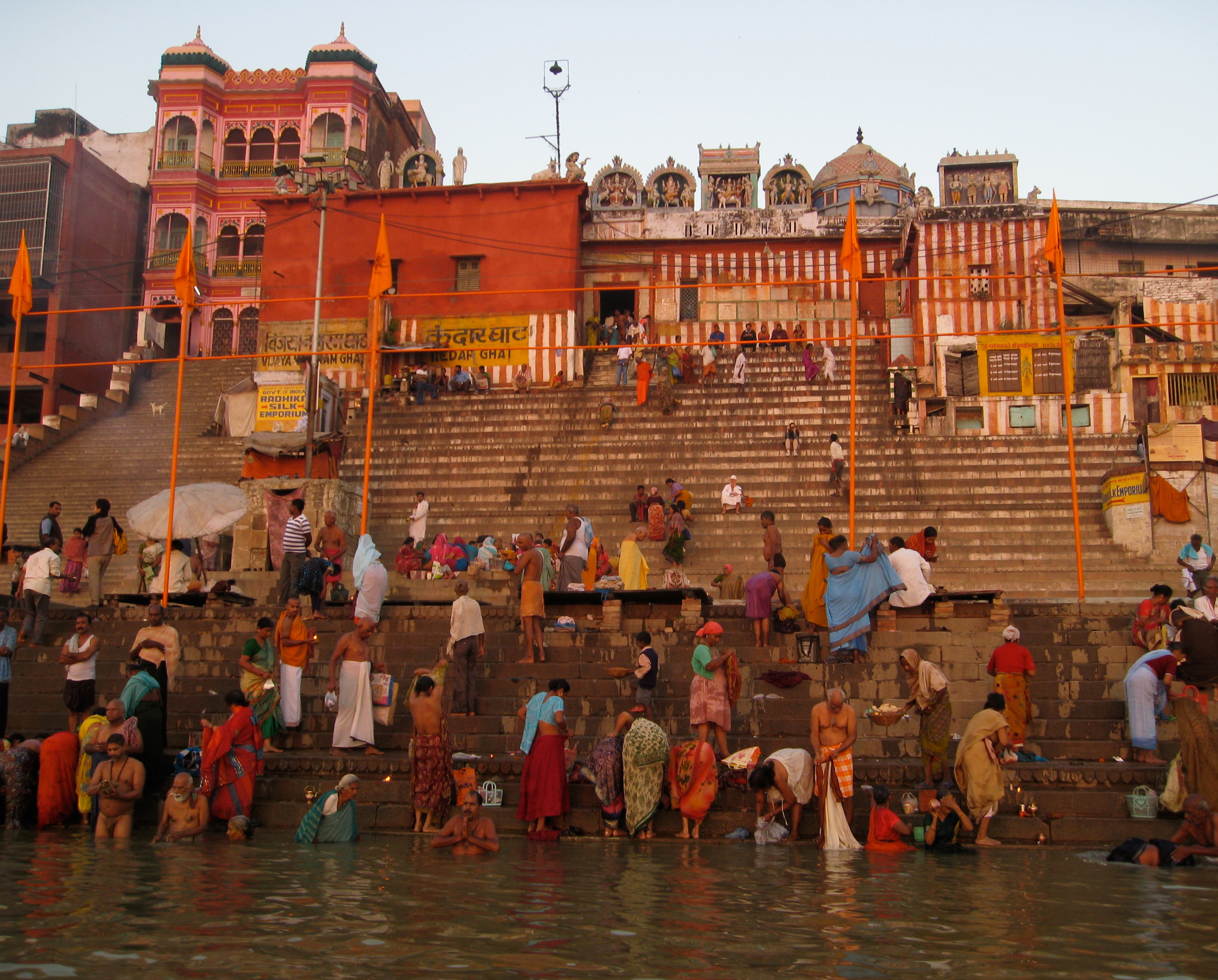
Kedar Ghat, a bathing place for pilgrims on the Ganges at Varanasi

Some pilgrimages are part of a Vrata (vow), which a Hindu may make for a number of reasons. It may mark a special occasion, such as the birth of a baby, or as part of a rite of passage such as a baby's first haircut, or after healing from a sickness. It may also be the result of prayers answered. An alternative reason for Tirtha, for some Hindus, is to respect wishes or in memory of a beloved person after their death. This may include dispersing their cremation ashes in a Tirtha region in a stream, river or sea to honour the wishes of the dead. The journey to a Tirtha, assert some Hindu texts, helps one overcome the sorrow of the loss. (Note: The cremation ashes are called phool (flowers). These are collected from the pyre in a rite-of-passage called asthi sanchayana, then dispersed during asthi visarjana. This signifies redemption of the dead in waters considered to be sacred and a closure for the living. Tirtha locations offer these services.)

Other reasons for a Tirtha in Hinduism is to rejuvenate or gain spiritual merit by travelling to famed temples or bathe in rivers such as the Ganges. Tirtha has been one of the recommended means of addressing remorse and to perform penance, for unintentional errors and intentional sins, in the Hindu tradition. The proper procedure for a pilgrimage is widely discussed in Hindu texts. The most accepted view is that the greatest austerity comes from travelling on foot, or part of the journey is on foot, and that the use of a conveyance is only acceptable if the pilgrimage is otherwise impossible.

== Culture ==
The term "Hindu culture" refers to mean aspects of culture that pertain to the religion, such as festivals and dress codes followed by the Hindus which is mainly can be inspired from the culture of India and Southeast Asia.

=== Architecture ===
Hindu architecture is the traditional system of Indian architecture for structures such as temples, monasteries, statues, homes, market places, gardens and town planning as described in Hindu texts. The architectural guidelines survive in Sanskrit manuscripts and in some cases also in other regional languages. These texts include the Vastu shastras, Shilpa Shastras, the Brihat Samhita, architectural portions of the Puranas and the Agamas, and regional texts such as the Manasara among others.

By far the most important, characteristic and numerous surviving examples of Hindu architecture are Hindu temples, with an architectural tradition that has left surviving examples in stone, brick, and rock-cut architecture dating back to the Gupta Empire. These architectures had influence of Ancient Persian and Hellenistic architecture. Far fewer works of secular Hindu architecture have survived into the modern era, such as palaces, homes and cities. Ruins and archaeological studies provide a view of early secular architecture in India.

Studies on Indian palaces and civic architectural history have largely focussed on the Mughal and Indo-Islamic architecture particularly of northern and western India given their relative abundance. In other regions of India, particularly the South, Hindu architecture continued to thrive through the 16th-century, such as those exemplified by the temples, ruined cities and secular spaces of the Vijayanagara Empire and the Nayakas. The secular architecture was never opposed to the religious in India, and it is the sacred architecture such as those found in the Hindu temples which were inspired by and adaptations of the secular ones. Further, states Harle, it is in the reliefs on temple walls, pillars, toranas and madapams where miniature version of the secular architecture can be found.

=== Art ===
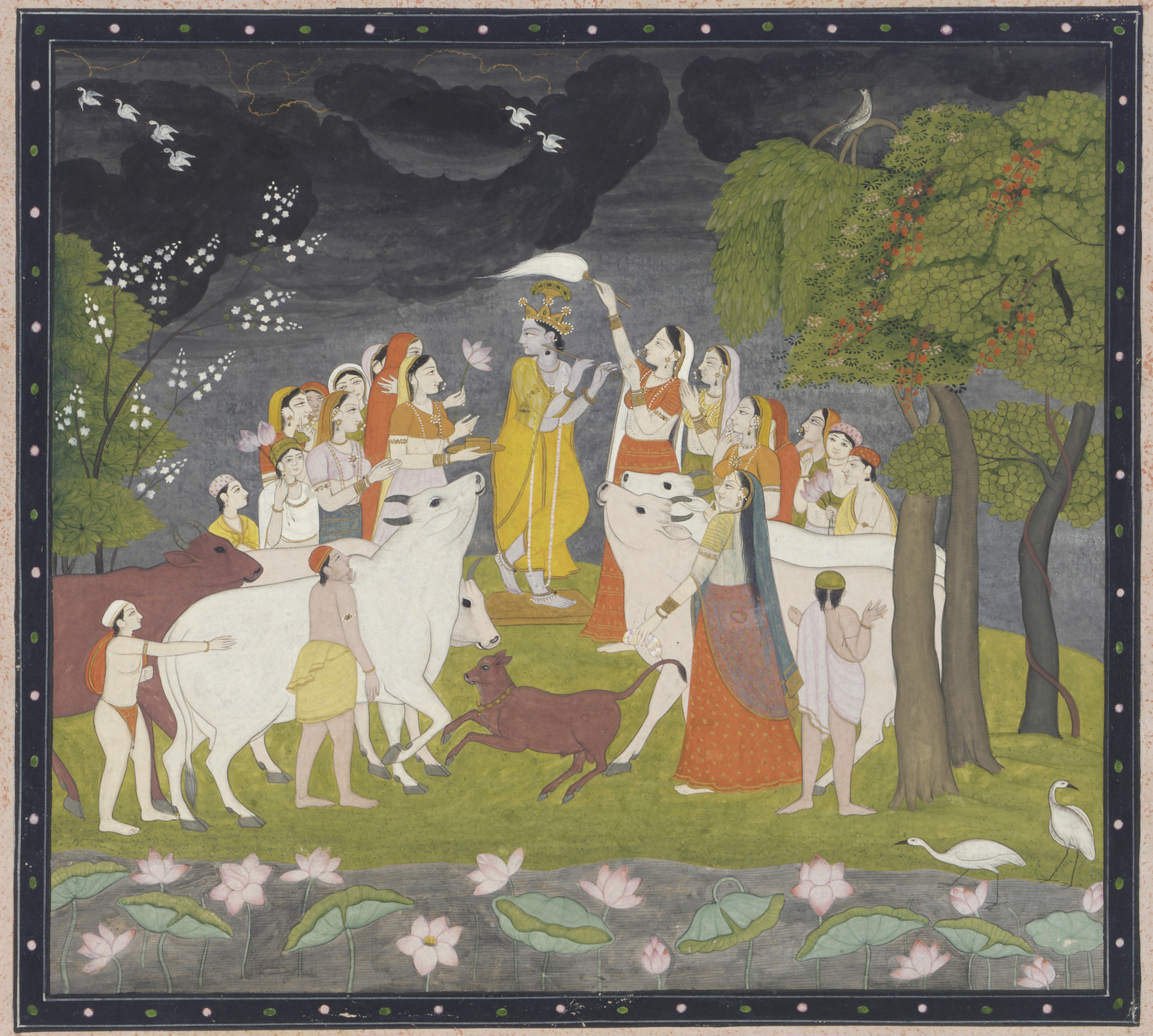
Krishna with cows, herdsmen, and Gopis

Hindu art encompasses the artistic traditions and styles culturally connected to Hinduism and have a long history of religious association with Hindu scriptures, rituals and worship. Hindu texts, such as the Bhagwata Purana and the Kama Sutra, outline 64 kinds of art forms that a person can master.

=== Calendar ===
The Hindu calendar, Panchanga (Sanskrit: पञ्चाङ्ग) or Panjika is one of various lunisolar calendars that are traditionally used in the Indian subcontinent and Southeast Asia, with further regional variations for social and Hindu religious purposes. They adopt a similar underlying concept for timekeeping based on sidereal year for solar cycle and adjustment of lunar cycles in every three years, but differ in their relative emphasis to moon cycle or the sun cycle and the names of months and when they consider the New Year to start. Of the various regional calendars, the most studied and known Hindu calendars are the Shalivahana Shaka (Based on the King Shalivahana, also the Indian national calendar) found in the Deccan region of Southern India and the Vikram Samvat (Bikrami) found in Nepal and the North and Central regions of India – both of which emphasise the lunar cycle. Their new year starts in spring. In regions such as Tamil Nadu and Kerala, the solar cycle is emphasised and this is called the Tamil calendar (though Tamil calendar uses month names like in Hindu Calendar) and Malayalam calendar and these have origins in the second half of the 1st millennium CE. A Hindu calendar is sometimes referred to as Panchangam (पञ्चाङ्गम्), which is also known as Panjika in Eastern India.

The ancient Hindu calendar conceptual design is also found in the Hebrew calendar, the Chinese calendar, and the Babylonian calendar, but different from the Gregorian calendar. Unlike the Gregorian calendar which adds additional days to the month to adjust for the mismatch between twelve lunar cycles (354 lunar days) and nearly 365 solar days, the Hindu calendar maintains the integrity of the lunar month, but inserts an extra full month, once every 32–33 months, to ensure that the festivals and crop-related rituals fall in the appropriate season.

The Hindu calendars have been in use in the Indian subcontinent since Vedic times, and remain in use by the Hindus all over the world, particularly to set Hindu festival dates. Early Buddhist communities of India adopted the ancient Vedic calendar, later Vikrami calendar and then local Buddhist calendars. Buddhist festivals continue to be scheduled according to a lunar system. The Buddhist calendar and the traditional lunisolar calendars of Cambodia, Laos, Myanmar, Sri Lanka and Thailand are also based on an older version of the Hindu calendar. Similarly, the ancient Jain traditions have followed the same lunisolar system as the Hindu calendar for festivals, texts and inscriptions. However, the Buddhist and Jain timekeeping systems have attempted to use the Buddha and the Mahavira's lifetimes as their reference points.

The Hindu calendar is also important to the practice of Hindu astrology and zodiac system. It is also employed for observing the auspicious days of deities and occasions of fasting, such as Ekadashi.

== Person and society ==
=== Varnas ===
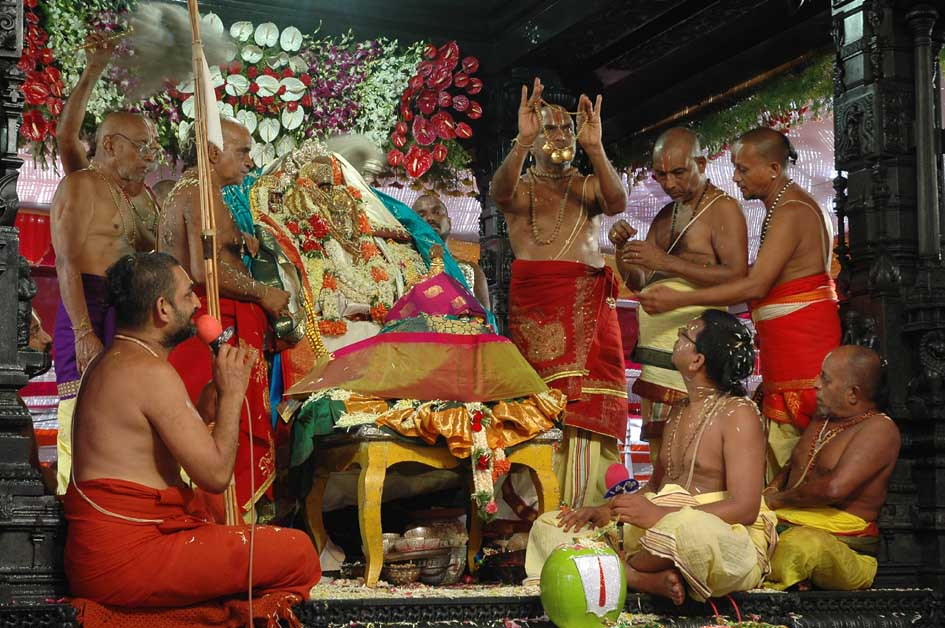
Priests performing Kalyanam (marriage) of the holy deities at Bhadrachalam Temple, in Telangana.

Hindu society has been categorised into four classes, called varṇas. They are the Brahmins: Vedic teachers and priests; the Kshatriyas: warriors and kings; the Vaishyas: farmers and merchants; and the Shudras: servants and labourers. The Bhagavad Gītā links the varṇa to an individual's duty (svadharma), inborn nature (svabhāva), and natural tendencies (guṇa). The Manusmriti categorises the different castes. Some mobility and flexibility within the varṇas challenge allegations of social discrimination in the caste system, as has been pointed out by several sociologists, although some other scholars disagree. Scholars debate whether the so-called caste system is part of Hinduism sanctioned by the scriptures or social custom. And various contemporary scholars have argued that the caste system was introduced by the British colonial regime; which is indeed false as it existed even before the westerners came to India.

A renunciant man of knowledge is usually called Varṇatita or "beyond all varṇas" in Vedantic works. The bhiksu is advised to not bother about the caste of the family from which he begs his food. Scholars like Adi Sankara affirm that not only is Brahman beyond all varṇas, the man who is identified with Him also transcends the distinctions and limitations of caste.

=== Yoga ===
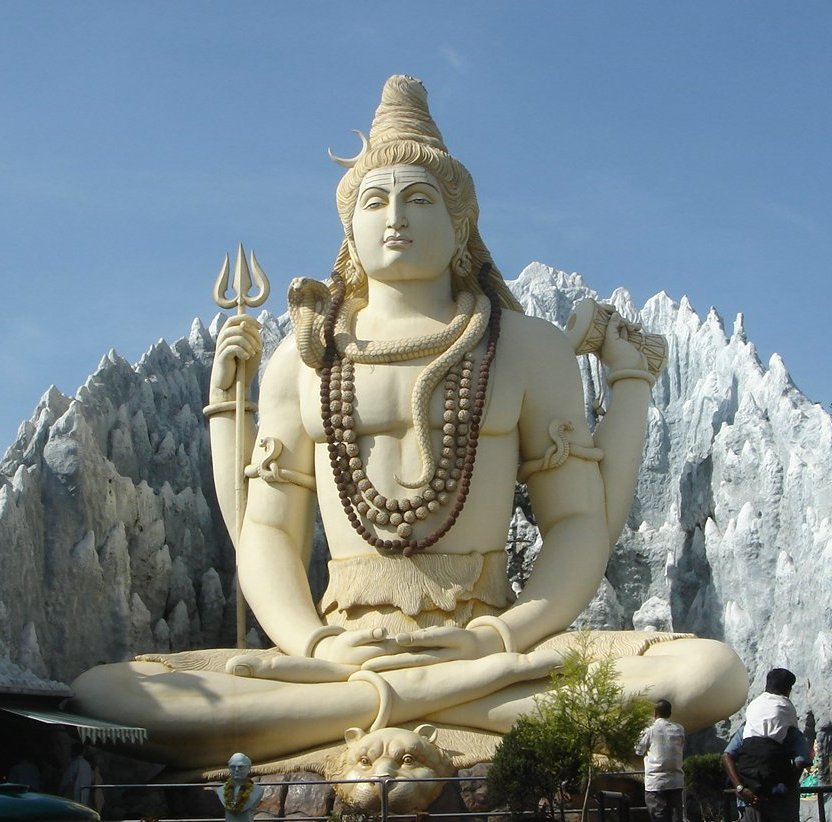
A statue of Shiva in yogic meditation

In whatever way a Hindu defines the goal of life, there are several methods (yogas) that sages have taught for reaching that goal. Yoga is a Hindu discipline which trains the body, mind, and consciousness for health, tranquility, and spiritual insight. Texts dedicated to yoga include the Yoga Sutras, the Hatha Yoga Pradipika, the Bhagavad Gita and, as their philosophical and historical basis, the Upanishads. Within the Bhagavad Gita, yoga is a means, with the four major margas (paths of yoga) as: Bhakti Yoga (the path of love and devotion), Karma Yoga (the path of right action), Rāja Yoga (the path of meditation), and Jñāna Yoga (the path of wisdom). An individual may prefer one or some yogas over others, according to their inclination and understanding. Practice of one yoga does not exclude others. The modern practice of yoga as exercise (traditionally Hatha yoga) has a contested relationship with Hinduism.

=== Symbolism ===
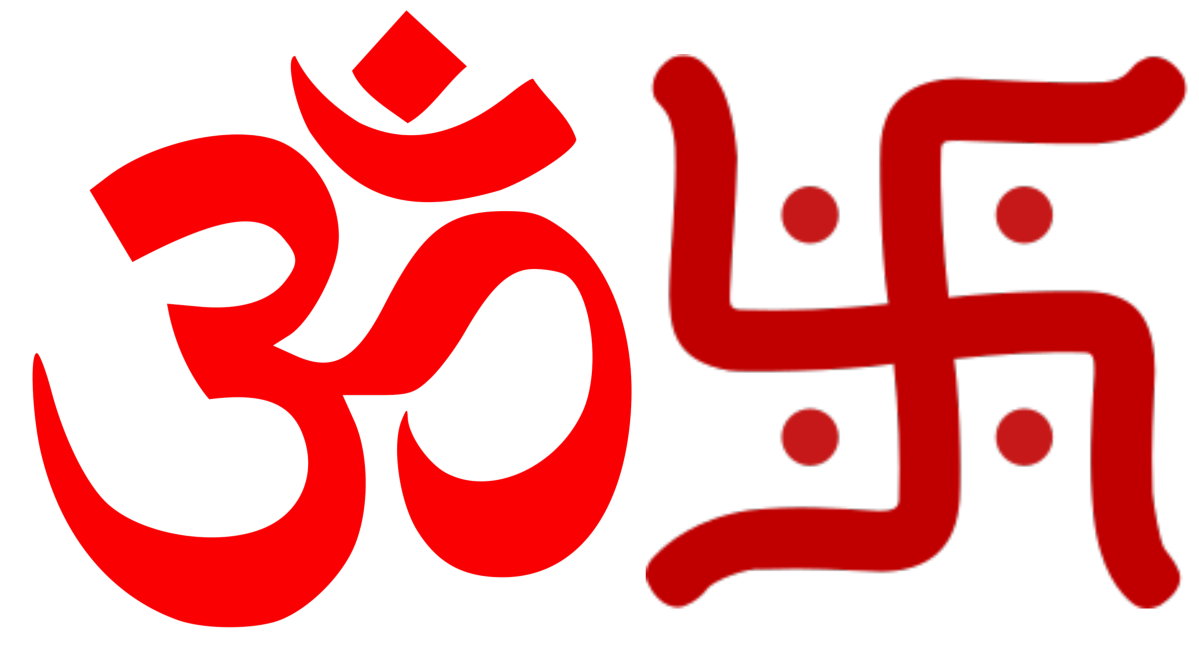
Some of the most prominent Hindu symbols: Om (left) and the Swastika (right)

Hinduism has a developed system of symbolism and iconography to represent the sacred in art, architecture, literature and worship. These symbols gain their meaning from the scriptures or cultural traditions. The syllable Om (which represents the Brahman and Atman) has grown to represent Hinduism itself, while other markings such as the Swastika (from the Sanskrit: स्वस्तिक, romanized: svastika) a sign that represents auspiciousness, and Tilaka (literally, seed) on forehead – considered to be the location of spiritual third eye, marks ceremonious welcome, blessing or one's participation in a ritual or rite of passage. Elaborate Tilaka with lines may also identify a devotee of a particular denomination. Flowers, birds, animals, instruments, symmetric mandala drawings, objects, lingam, idols are all part of symbolic iconography in Hinduism.

=== Ahiṃsā and food customs ===
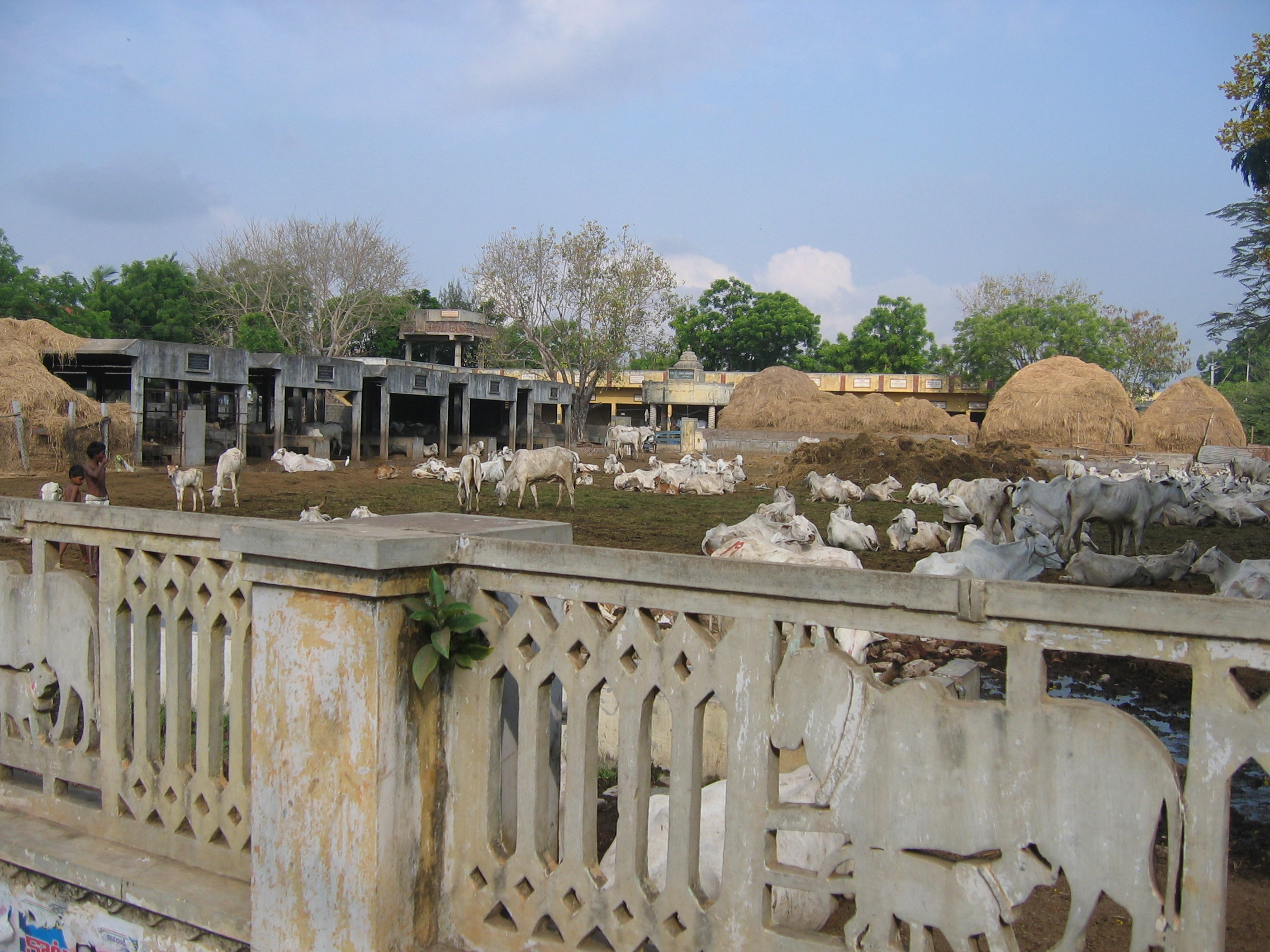
A goshala or cow shelter at Guntur

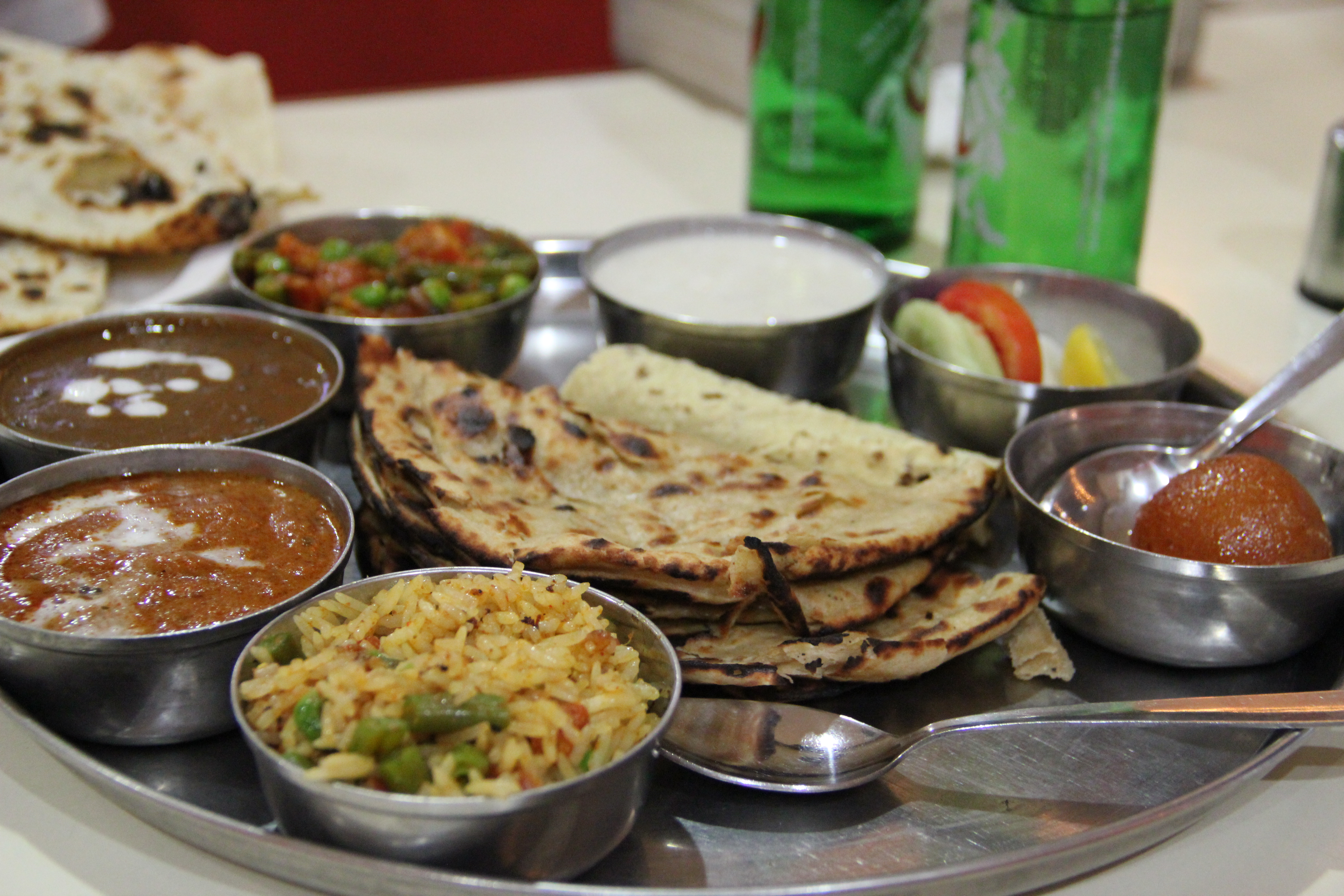
A vegetarian thali

Hindus advocate the practice of ahiṃsā (nonviolence) and respect for all life because divinity is believed to permeate all beings, including plants and non-human animals. The term ahiṃsā appears in the Upanishads, the epic Mahabharata and ahiṃsā is the first of the five Yamas (vows of self-restraint) in Patanjali's Yoga Sutras. Hindu texts such as Śāṇḍilya Upanishad and Svātmārāma recommend Mitahara (eating in moderation) as one of the Yamas (virtuous Self restraints). According to Hindu beliefs, food affects the body, mind, and spirit. The Bhagavad Gita links body and mind to food one consumes in verses 17.8 through 17.10.

In accordance with ahiṃsā, many Hindus embrace vegetarianism to respect higher forms of life. Estimates of strict lacto vegetarians in India (includes adherents of all religions) who never eat any meat, fish or eggs vary between 20% and 42%, while others are either less strict vegetarians or non-vegetarians. Those who eat meat seek Jhatka (quick death) method of meat production, and dislike Halal (slow bled death) method, believing that quick death method reduces suffering to the animal. The food habits vary with region, with Bengali Hindus and Hindus living in Himalayan regions, or river delta regions, regularly eating meat and fish. Some avoid meat on specific festivals or occasions. Observant Hindus who do eat meat almost always abstain from beef. Hinduism specifically considers Bos indicus to be sacred. The cow in Hindu society is traditionally identified as a caretaker and a maternal figure, and Hindu society honours the cow as a symbol of unselfish giving, selfless sacrifice, gentleness and tolerance. There are many Hindu groups that have continued to abide by a strict vegetarian diet in modern times. Some adhere to a diet that is devoid of meat, eggs, and seafood.

Some Hindus such as those belonging to the Shaktism tradition, and Hindus in regions such as Bali and Nepal practise animal sacrifice. The sacrificed animal is eaten as ritual food. In contrast, the Vaishnava Hindus abhor and vigorously oppose animal sacrifice. The principle of non-violence to animals has been so thoroughly adopted in Hinduism that animal sacrifice is uncommon and historically reduced to a vestigial marginal practice.

== Institutions ==
=== Temple ===
Illustration of Hindu temples in Asia
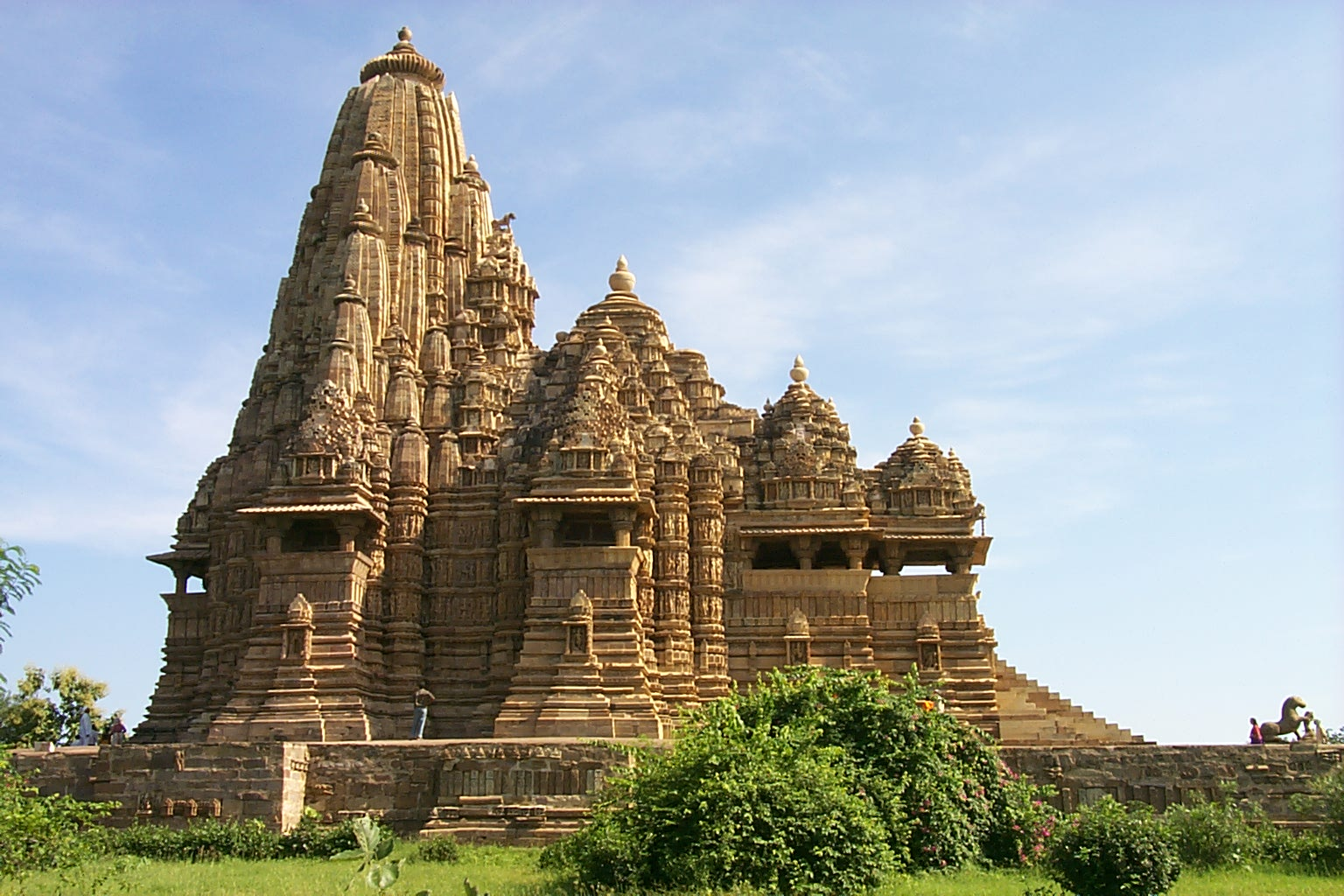
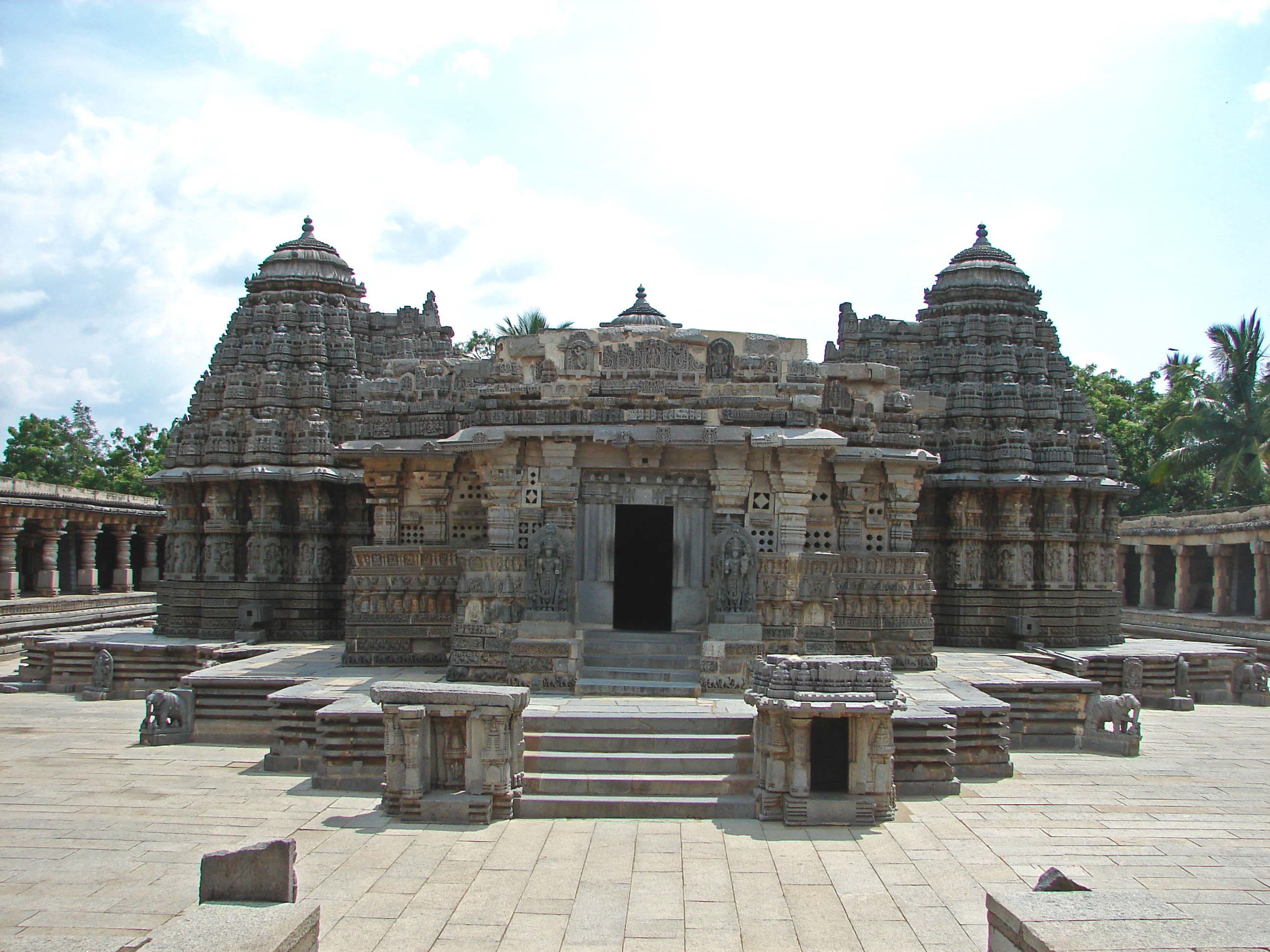
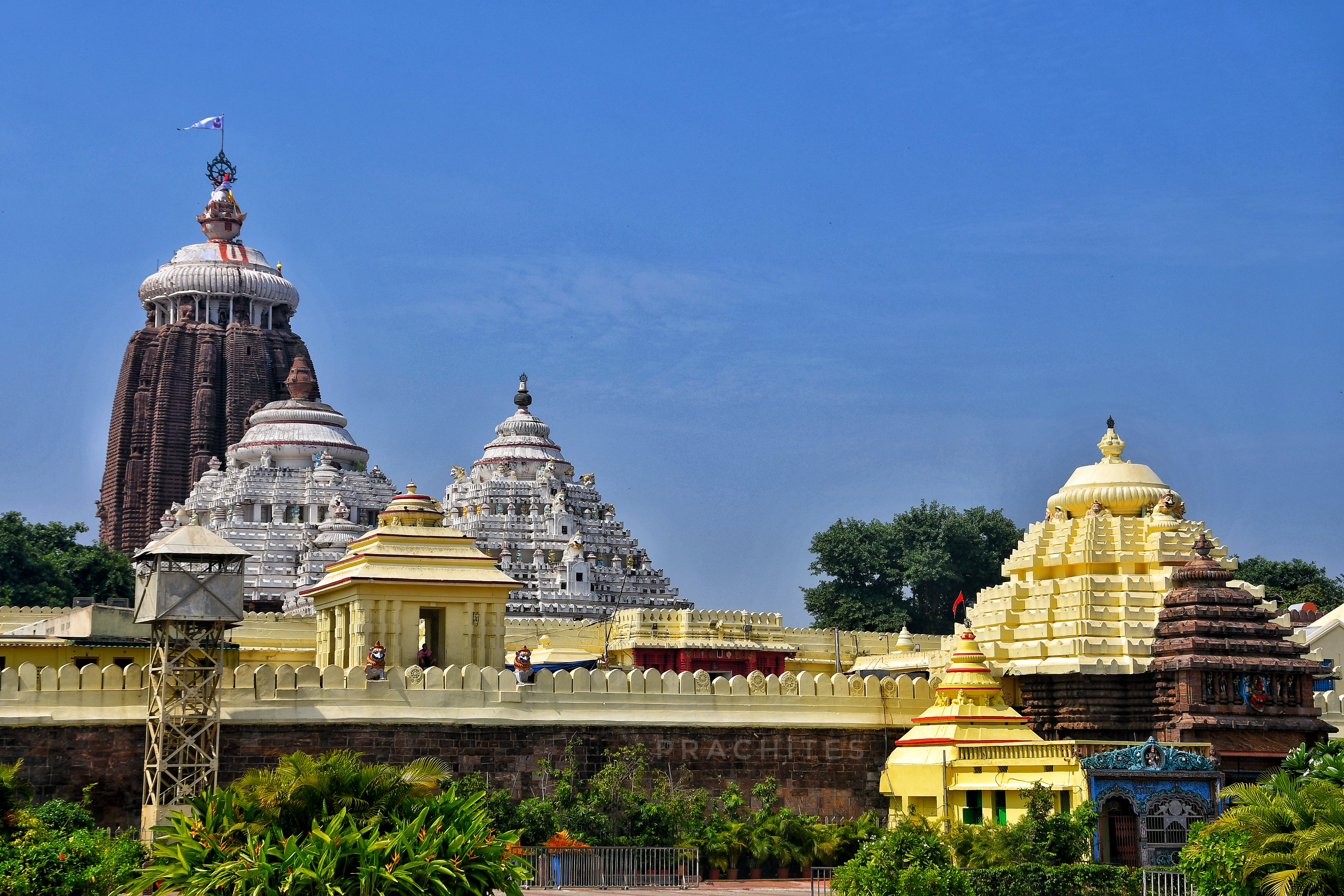
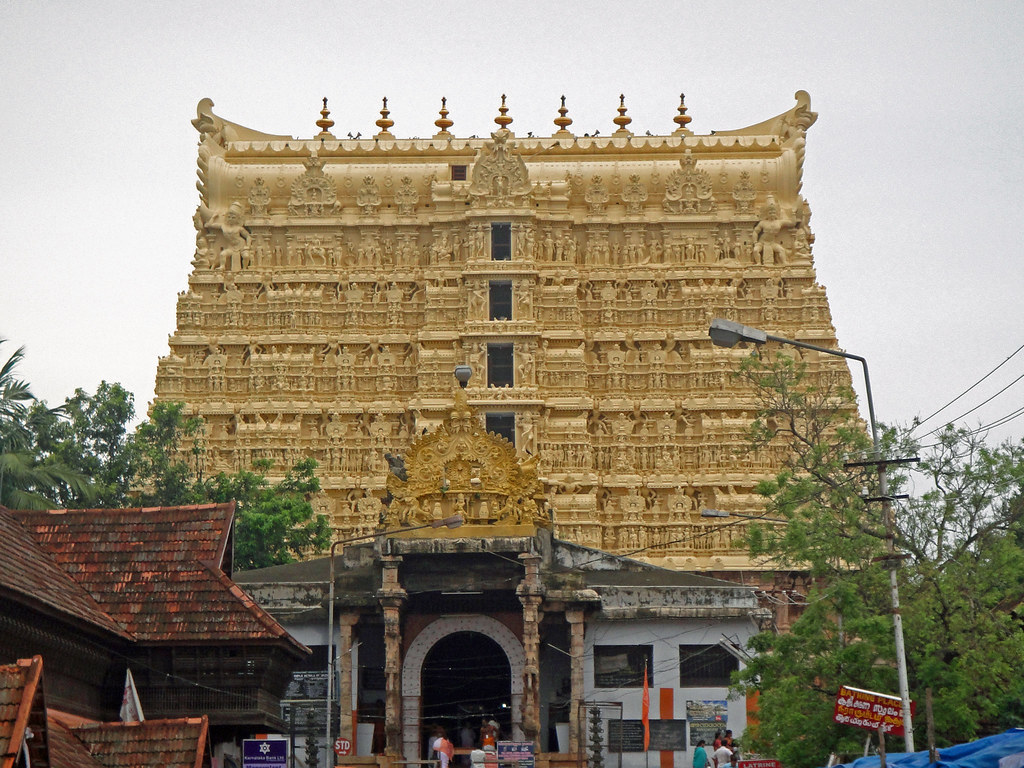
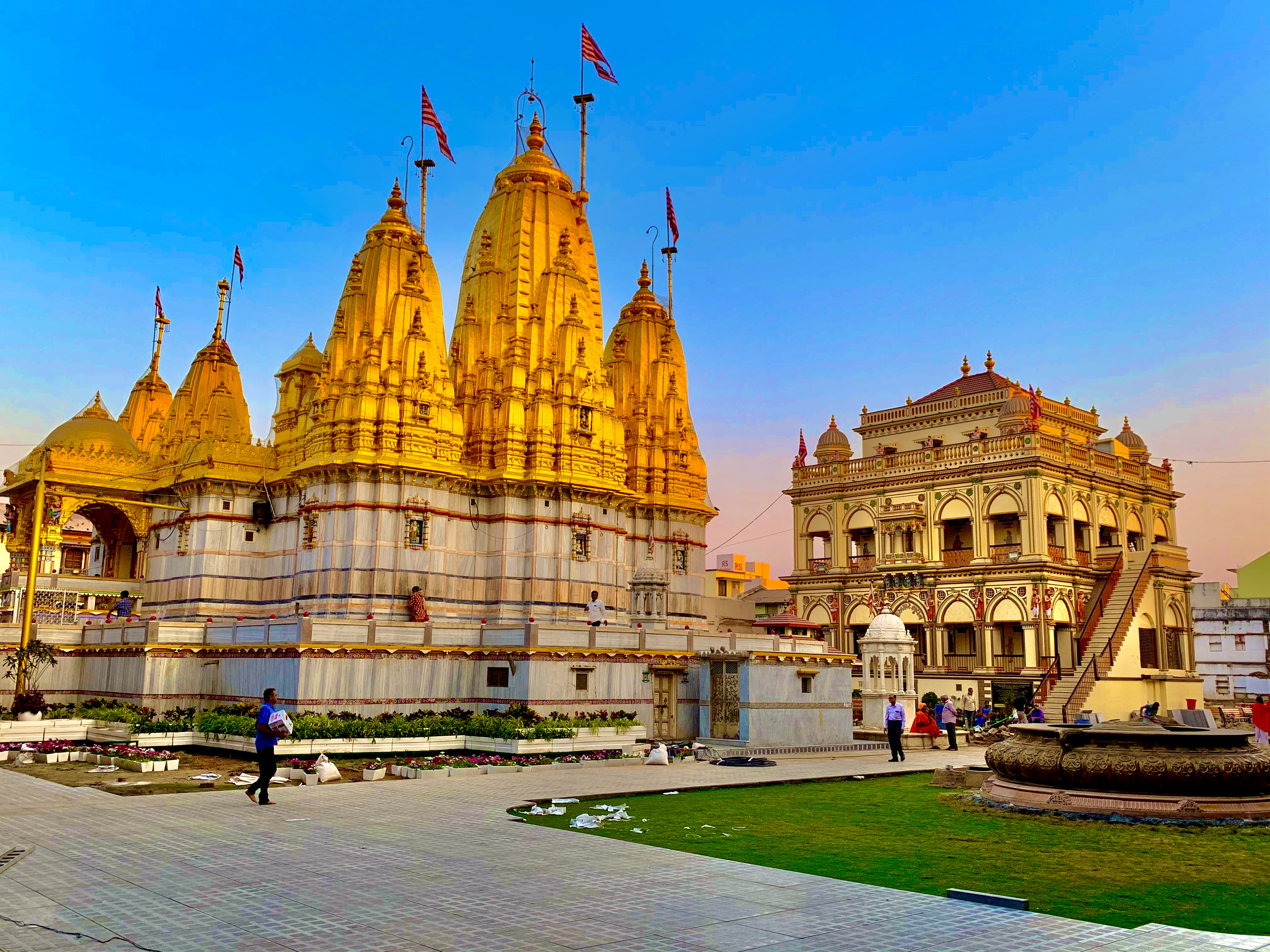
Clockwise from top-left: Kandariya Mahadeva Temple, Madhya Pradesh; Chennakeshava Temple, Karnataka; Jagannath Temple, Puri, Odisha; Padmanabhaswamy temple, Kerala; Swaminarayan Mandir, Vadtal, Gujarat.

A Hindu temple is a house of god(s). It is a space and structure designed to bring human beings and gods together, infused with symbolism to express the ideas and beliefs of Hinduism. A temple incorporates all elements of Hindu cosmology, the highest spire or dome representing Mount Meru – reminder of the abode of Brahma and the center of spiritual universe, the carvings and iconography symbolically presenting dharma, kama, artha, moksha and karma. The layout, the motifs, the plan and the building process recite ancient rituals, geometric symbolisms, and reflect beliefs and values innate within various schools of Hinduism. Hindu temples are spiritual destinations for many Hindus (not all), as well as landmarks for arts, annual festivals, rite of passage rituals, and community celebrations.

Hindu temples come in many styles, diverse locations, deploy different construction methods and are adapted to different deities and regional beliefs. Two major styles of Hindu temples include the Gopuram style found in south India, and Nagara style found in north India. Other styles include cave, forest and mountain temples. Yet, despite their differences, almost all Hindu temples share certain common architectural principles, core ideas, symbolism and themes.

Many temples feature one or more idols (murtis). The idol and Grabhgriya in the Brahma-pada (the center of the temple), under the main spire, serves as a focal point (darsana, a sight) in a Hindu temple. In larger temples, the central space typically is surrounded by an ambulatory for the devotee to walk around and ritually circumambulate the Purusa (Brahman), the universal essence.

=== Asrama ===
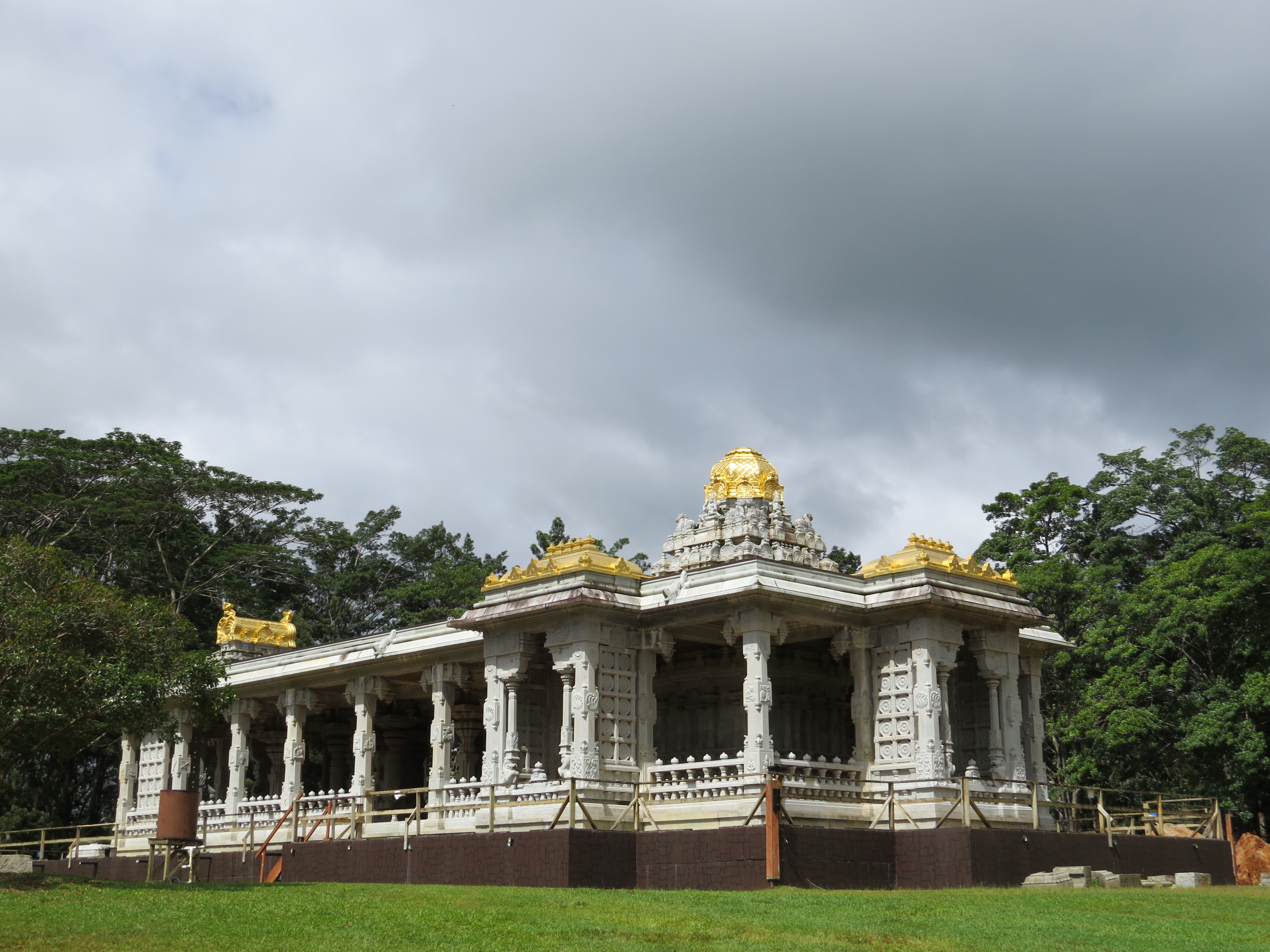
Kauai Hindu monastery on Kauaʻi Island in Hawaii is the only Hindu monastery in North America.

Traditionally the life of a Hindu is divided into four Āśramas (phases or life stages; another meaning includes monastery). The four ashramas are: Brahmacharya (student), Grihastha (householder), Vānaprastha (retired) and Sannyasa (renunciation). Brahmacharya represents the bachelor student stage of life. Grihastha refers to the individual's married life, with the duties of maintaining a household, raising a family, educating one's children, and leading a family-centred and a dharmic social life. Grihastha stage starts with Hindu wedding, and has been considered the most important of all stages in sociological context, as Hindus in this stage not only pursued a virtuous life, they produced food and wealth that sustained people in other stages of life, as well as the offsprings that continued mankind. Vanaprastha is the retirement stage, where a person hands over household responsibilities to the next generation, took an advisory role, and gradually withdrew from the world. The Sannyasa stage marks renunciation and a state of disinterest and detachment from material life, generally without any meaningful property or home (ascetic state), and focused on Moksha, peace and simple spiritual life.

The Ashramas system has been one facet of the dharma concept in Hinduism. Combined with four proper goals of human life (Purusartha), the Ashramas system traditionally aimed at providing a Hindu with fulfilling life and spiritual liberation. While these stages are typically sequential, any person can enter Sannyasa (ascetic) stage and become an Ascetic at any time after the Brahmacharya stage. Sannyasa is not religiously mandatory in Hinduism, and elderly people are free to live with their families.

=== Monasticism ===
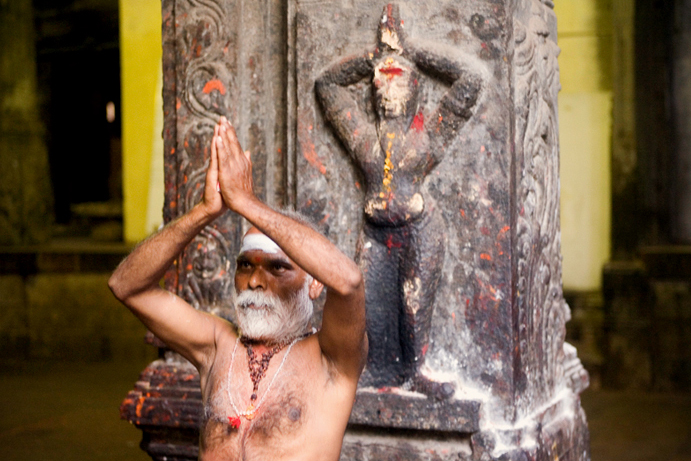
A sadhu in Madurai, India

Some Hindus choose to live a monastic life (Sannyāsa) in pursuit of liberation (moksha) or another form of spiritual perfection. Monastics commit themselves to a simple and celibate life, detached from material pursuits, of meditation and spiritual contemplation. A Hindu monk is called a Sanyāsī, Sādhu, or Swāmi. A female renunciate is called a Sanyāsini. Renunciates receive high respect in Hindu society because of their simple ahiṃsā-driven lifestyle and dedication to spiritual liberation (moksha) – believed to be the ultimate goal of life in Hinduism. Some monastics live in monasteries, while others wander from place to place, depending on donated food and charity for their needs.

== History ==
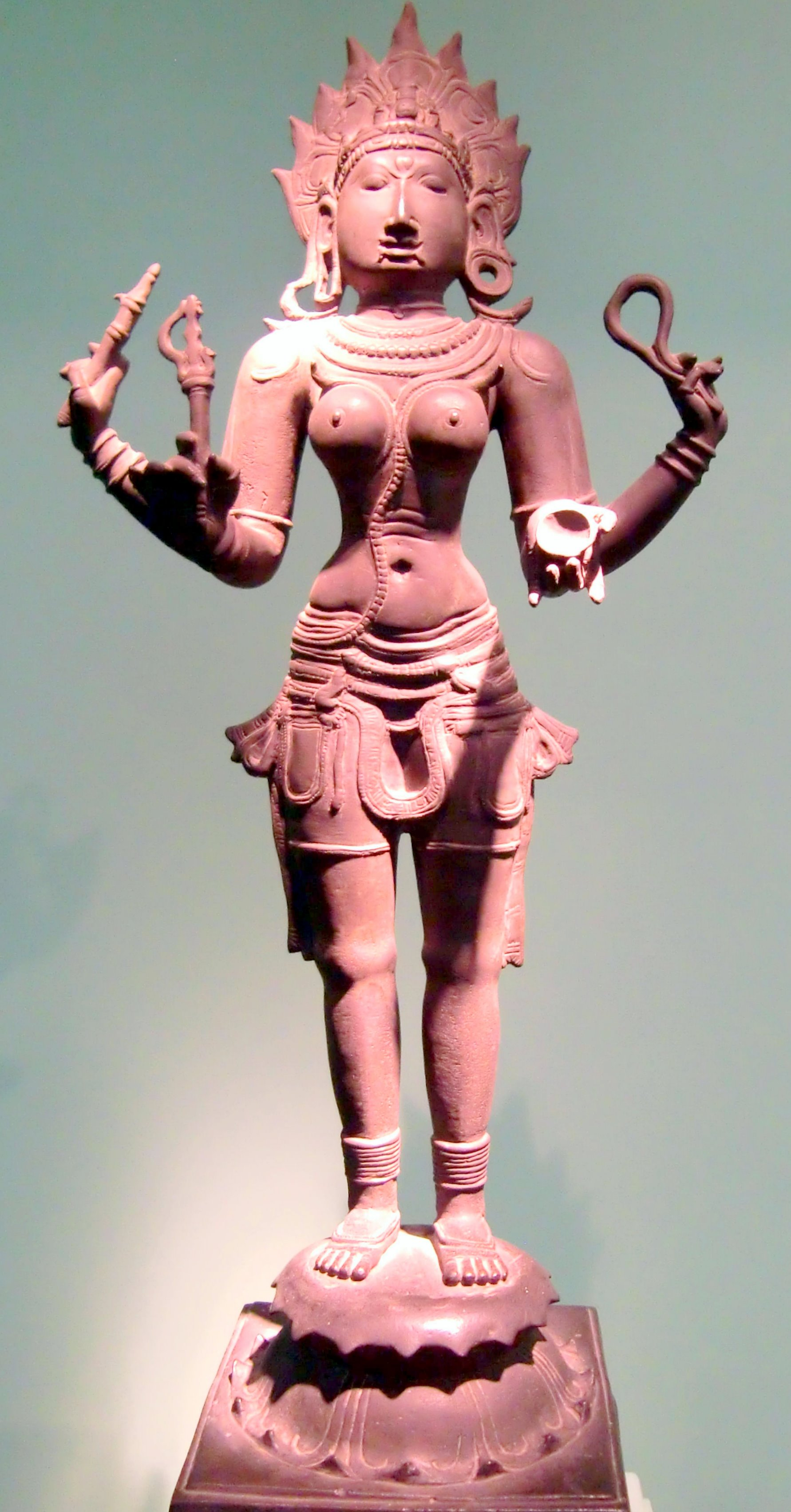
A Tamil depiction of Kali from the 12th century

Hinduism's varied history overlaps or coincides with the development of religion in the Indian subcontinent since the Iron Age, with some of its traditions tracing back to prehistoric religions such as those of the Bronze Age Indus Valley Civilisation. While the traditional Itihasa-Purana and the Epic-Puranic chronology derived from it present Hinduism as a tradition existing for thousands of years, scholars regard Hinduism as a synthesis of various Indian cultures and traditions, with diverse roots and no single founder, (Note: Among its roots are the Vedic religion of the late Vedic period and its emphasis on the status of Brahmans, but also the religions of the Indus Valley Civilisation, the śramaṇa or renouncer traditions of east India, and "popular or local traditions".) which emerged after the Vedic period, between c. 500–200 BCE and c. 300 CE.

The history of Hinduism is often divided into periods of development. The first period is the pre-Vedic period, which includes the Indus Valley Civilization and local pre-historic religions, ending at about 1750 BCE. This period was followed in northern India by the Vedic period, which saw the introduction of the historical Vedic religion with the Indo-Aryan migrations, starting somewhere between 1900 BCE to 1400 BCE. (Note: There is no exact dating possible for the beginning of the Vedic period. Witzel mentions a range between 1900 and 1400 BCE. Flood mentions 1500 BCE.) The subsequent period, between 800 BCE and 200 BCE, is "a turning point between the Vedic religion and Hindu religions", and a formative period for Hinduism, Jainism and Buddhism. The Epic and Early Puranic period, from c. 200 BCE to 500 CE, saw the classical "Golden Age" of Hinduism (c. 320–650 CE), which coincides with the Gupta Empire. In this period the six branches of Hindu philosophy evolved, namely Samkhya, Yoga, Nyaya, Vaisheshika, Mīmāṃsā, and Vedanta. Monotheistic sects like Shaivism and Vaishnavism developed during this same period through the Bhakti movement. The period from roughly 650 to 1100 CE forms the late Classical period or early Middle Ages, in which classical Puranic Hinduism is established, and Adi Shankara's influential consolidation of Advaita Vedanta.

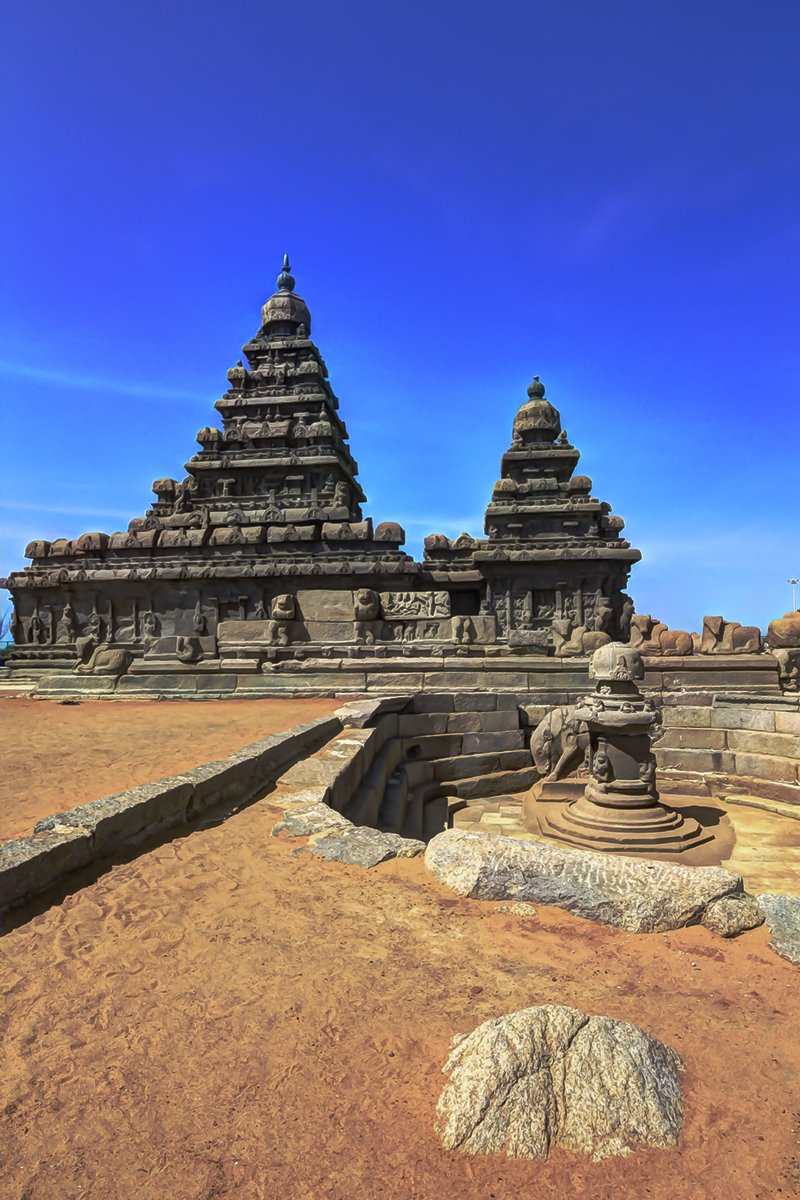
The Hindu Shore Temple at Mahabalipuram was built by Narasimhavarman II.

Hinduism under both Hindu and Islamic rulers from c. 1250–1750 CE, saw the increasing prominence of the Bhakti movement, which remains influential today. Historic persecutions of Hindus happened under Muslim rulers and also by Christian Missionaries. In Goa, the 1560 inquisition by Portuguese colonists is also considered one of the most brutal persecutions of Hindus. The colonial period saw the emergence of various Hindu reform movements partly inspired by western movements, such as Unitarianism and Theosophy. In the Kingdom of Nepal, the Unification of Nepal by Shah dynasty was accompanied by the Hinduization of the state and continued till the c. 1950s. Indians were hired as plantation labourers in British colonies such as Fiji, Mauritius, Trinidad and Tobago. The Partition of India in 1947 was along religious lines, with the Republic of India emerging with a Hindu majority. Between 200,000 and one million people, including both Muslims and Hindus, were killed during the Partition of India. During the 20th century, due to the Indian diaspora, Hindu minorities have formed in all continents, with the largest communities in absolute numbers in the United States, and the United Kingdom.

Although religious conversion from and to Hinduism has been a controversial and debated subject in India, Nepal, and in Indonesia, (Note: According to Sharma, the concept of missionary conversion, either way, is anathema to the precepts of Hinduism.) in the 20th–21st century, many missionary organisations such as ISKCON, Sathya Sai Organization, Vedanta Society have been influential in spreading the core culture of Hinduism outside India. (Note: Hinduism is the fastest growing religion in Russia, Ghana and United States. This was due to the influence of the ISKCON and the migration of Hindus in these nations.; In western nations, the growth of Hinduism has been very fast and is the second fastest growing religion in Europe, after Islam.) Religious leaders of some Hindu reform movements such as the Arya Samaj launched Shuddhi movement to proselytise and reconvert Muslims and Christians back to Hinduism, while those such as the Brahmo Samaj suggested Hinduism to be a non-missionary religion. All these sects of Hinduism have welcomed new members to their group, while other leaders of Hinduism's diverse schools have stated that given the intensive proselytisation activities from missionary Islam and Christianity, this "there is no such thing as proselytism in Hinduism" view must be re-examined.

== Demographics ==
According to the 2020 population estimate by Pew Research Center, 95% of the global Hindu population of 1,177,860,000 is concentrated in India, the only country with a Hindu population exceeding one billion. Hindus constitute 14.9% of the world's population. Outside of India, the countries with the largest Hindu populations are Nepal (more than 20,000,000), Bangladesh (more than 10,000,000), and Pakistan, Indonesia, and Sri Lanka—each of which is home to between three to six million Hindus. The majority of the Indonesian Tenggerese people in Java and the Vietnamese Cham people also follow Hinduism, with the largest proportion of the Chams in Ninh Thuận Province.

Global percentage of adherents by religion. Hindus comprise about 14.9% of the world's population, comprising the third largest by percentage.

Demographically, Hinduism is the world's third largest religion, after Christianity and Islam. Hinduism is the third fastest-growing religion in the world after Islam and Christianity, with a predicted growth rate of 34% between 2010 and 2050.

Countries with the greatest proportion of Hindus:

1. Nepal – 81.19%
2. India – 79.8%
3. Mauritius – 47.9%
4. Guyana – 31%
5. Fiji – 27.9%
6. Trinidad and Tobago – 24.3%
7. Bhutan – 22.6%
8. Suriname – 22.3%
9. Qatar – 15.9%
10. Sri Lanka – 12.6%
11. Bahrain – 9.8%
12. Bangladesh – 7.9%
13. Réunion – 6.8% (Note: Réunion is not a country, but an overseas department and region of France.)
14. United Arab Emirates – 6.6%
15. Malaysia – 6.3%
16. Kuwait – 6%
17. Oman – 5.5%
18. Seychelles – 5.4%
19. Singapore – 5%
20. Indonesia – 3.9%
21. New Zealand – 2.9%
22. Australia – 2.7%
23. Pakistan – 2.2%

Demographics of major traditions within Hinduism (World Religion Database, as of 2020)
Tradition	Followers
Vaishnavism	399,526,000
Shaivism	385,423,000
Shaktism	305,643,000
Neo-Hinduism	20,300,000
Reform Hinduism	5,200,000
Cumulative	1,116,092,000

== See also ==
=== Hinduism ===
- Hindus
- Hindu atheism
- Crypto-Hinduism
- The Buddha in Hinduism
- Anti-Hindu sentiment
- Hindu eschatology
- Hinduism by country
- Indomania
- Jagarana
- Lists of Hindus
- Encyclopedia of Hinduism
- Vegetarianism
- Criticism of Hinduism
- Hindu temple

=== Related systems and religions ===
- Adivasi religion
- Bathouism
- Donyi-Polo
- Dravidian folk religion
- Eastern religions
- Eastern philosophy
- Gurung shamanism
- Bon
- Hinduism and other religions
  - Hinduism and Judaism
  - Hinduism and Sikhism
  - Buddhism and Hinduism
  - Hinduism and Theosophy
  - Hinduism and Zoroastrianism
- Indian religions
- Kalash religion
- Kiratism
- Sarna sthal
- Manichaeism
- Peterburgian Vedism
- Proto-Indo-European religion
- Proto-Indo-Iranian religion
- Hinduism and science
- Sanamahism
- Sarnaism
- Sikhism
- Tribal religions in India
- Zoroastrianism
- Religion of the Indus Valley Civilisation
- Ancient Iranian religion

== Sources ==
For references on specific authors or topics, please see the relevant article.

Printed sources

- Acharya, P. K. (1927). Indian Architecture according to the Manasara Shilpa Shastra. London: Oxford University Press (Republ. by Motilal Banarsidass). Reprint: ISBN 0-300-06217-6.
- Acri, Andrea; Creese, Helen; Griffiths, Arlo, eds. (2011). From Lanka Eastwards: The Ramayaṇa in the Literature and Visual Arts of Indonesia. Leiden: KITLV Press.
- Bakker, F.L. (1997). "Balinese Hinduism and the Indonesian State: Recent Developments". Journal of the Humanities and Social Sciences of Southeast Asia. 153 (1): 15–41. doi:10.1163/22134379-90003943. JSTOR 27864809. S2CID 162277591.
- Barua, Ankur (2015). Debating 'Conversion' in Hinduism and Christianity. Routledge. ISBN 978-1-138-84701-9.
- Beck, Guy L., ed. (2005). Alternative Krishnas: Regional and Vernacular Variations on a Hindu Deity. Albany, NY: SUNY Press. ISBN 978-0-7914-6415-1.
- Bhardwaj, Surinder Mohan (1983). Hindu Places of Pilgrimage in India: A Study in Cultural Geography. University of California Press. ISBN 978-0-520-04951-2.
- Bhaskarananda, Swami (1994). Essentials of Hinduism. Viveka Press. ISBN 978-1-884852-02-2.
- Bhattacharya, A (2006). Hindu Dharma: Introduction to Scriptures and Theology. iUniverse. ISBN 978-0-595-38455-6.
- Bilimoria, Purushottama; Prabhu, Joseph; Sharma, Renuka, eds. (2007). Indian Ethics: Classical Traditions and Contemporary Challenges. Routledge. ISBN 978-1-138-06269-6.
- Bowker, John (2000). The Concise Oxford Dictionary of World Religions. Oxford University Press. ISBN 978-0-19-280094-7.
- Bhandarkar, R. G. (1913). Vaiṣṇavism, Śaivism and Minor Religious Systems. Grundriss der indo-arischen Philologie und Altertumskunde, 3.6. Strassburg: Trübner.
- Brodd, Jeffrey (2003). World Religions. Winona, MN: Saint Mary's Press. ISBN 978-0-88489-725-5.
- Bronkhorst, Johannes (2007). Greater Magadha: Studies in the Culture of Early India. Brill.
- Bryant, Edwin (2007). Krishna: A Sourcebook. Oxford University Press.
- Bryant, Edwin F.; Ekstrand, Maria, eds. (2004). The Hare Krishna Movement: The Postcharismatic Fate of a Religious Transplant. New York: Columbia University Press. ISBN 0-231-12256-X.
- Burley, Mikel (2007). Classical Samkhya and Yoga: An Indian Metaphysics of Experience. Taylor & Francis.
- Brodd, Jeffrey; Little, Layne; Nystrom, Bradley; Platzner, Robert; Shek, Richard; Stiles, Erin (2018). "Hinduism". Invitation to World Religions (3 ed.). Oxford University Press. ISBN 978-0-19-069081-6.
- Carney, Gerald T. (2020). "Baba Premananda Bharati: his trajectory into and through Bengal Vaiṣṇavism to the West". In Ferdinando Sardella; Lucian Wong (eds.). The Legacy of Vaiṣṇavism in Colonial Bengal. Routledge Hindu Studies Series. London; New York: Routledge. pp. 135–160. ISBN 978-1-138-56179-3.
- Christian, David (2011). Maps of Time: An Introduction to Big History. University of California Press. ISBN 978-0-520-95067-2.
- Chung, Paul S. (2022). The Social Scientific Study of Religion: A Method for Constructive Theology. Lutterworth Press. ISBN 978-0-227-17768-6.
- Clarke, Peter Bernard (2006). New Religions in Global Perspective. Routledge. p. 209. ISBN 978-0-7007-1185-7.
- Clarke, Matthew (2011). Development and Religion: Theology and Practice. Edward Elgar Publishing. p. 28. ISBN 978-0-85793-073-6. Archived from the original on 29 December 2020.
- Cœdès, George (1968). The Indianized States of Southeast Asia. Translated by Susan Brown Cowing. Honolulu: University of Hawaii Press. ISBN 978-0-8248-0368-1.
- Coward, Harold (2008). The perfectibility of human nature in eastern and western thought. SUNY Press. ISBN 978-0-7914-7336-8.
- Dalal, Roshen (2010). The Religions of India: A Concise Guide to Nine Major Faiths. Delhi: Penguin Books India. ISBN 978-0-14-341517-6.
- David, Bruno; Mullett, Russell; Wright, Nathan; Stephenson, Birgitta; Ash, Jeremy; Fresløv, Joanna; Delannoy, Jean-Jacques; McDowell, Matthew C.; Mialanes, Jerome; Petchey, Fiona; Arnold, Lee J.; Rogers, Ashleigh J.; Crouch, Joe; Green, Helen; Urwin, Chris; Matheson, Carney D. (1 July 2024). "Archaeological evidence of an ethnographically documented Australian Aboriginal ritual dated to the last ice age". Nature Human Behaviour. 8 (8): 1481–1492. doi:10.1038/s41562-024-01912-w. ISSN 2397-3374. PMC 11343701. PMID 38951612.
- Deutsch, Eliot (2001). "The self in Advaita Vedanta". In Roy Perrett (ed.). Indian philosophy: Volume 3, metaphysics. Taylor and Francis. pp. 343–360. ISBN 978-0-8153-3608-2.
- Deutsch, Eliot; Dalvi, Rohit (2004). The essential Vedanta. A New Source Book of Advaita Vedanta. World Wisdom. ISBN 978-0-941532-52-5.
- Dirks, Nicholas (2001). Castes of Mind: Colonialism and the Making of Modern India. Princeton University Press. ISBN 978-0-691-08895-2.
- Dixon, R. M. W. (1996). "Origin legends and linguistic relationships". Oceania. 67 (2): 127–140. doi:10.1002/j.1834-4461.1996.tb02587.x. JSTOR 40331537.
- Doniger, Wendy (1990). Textual Sources for the Study of Hinduism. University of Chicago Press. ISBN 978-0-226-61847-0.
- Doniger, Wendy (2000). Merriam-Webster's Encyclopedia of World Religions. Merriam-Webster. ISBN 978-0-87779-044-0.
- Doniger, Wendy (2010). The Hindus: An Alternative History. Oxford University Press. ISBN 978-0-19-959334-7.
- Doniger, Wendy (2014). On Hinduism. Oxford University Press USA. ISBN 978-0-19-936007-9.
- Eck, Diana L. (2012). India: A Sacred Geography. Harmony. ISBN 978-0-385-53190-0.
- Eck, Diana L. (2013). India: A Sacred Geography. Random House. ISBN 978-0-385-53192-4.
- Eliade, Mircea (2009). Yoga: Immortality and Freedom. Princeton University Press. ISBN 978-0-691-14203-6.
- Espín, Orlando O.; Nickoloff, James B., eds. (2007). An Introductory Dictionary of Theology and Religious Studies. Liturgical Press. ISBN 978-0-8146-5856-7.
- Feuerstein, Georg (2002). The Yoga Tradition. Motilal Banarsidass. ISBN 978-3-935001-06-9.
- Flood, Gavin (1996). An Introduction to Hinduism. Cambridge: Cambridge University Press. ISBN 978-0-521-43878-0. Archived from the original on 29 November 2016.
- Flood, Gavin (1997). "The Meaning and Context of the Puruṣārthas". In Lipner, Julius J. (ed.). The Bhagavadgītā for Our Times. Oxford University Press. ISBN 978-0-19-565039-6.
- Flood, Gavin, ed. (2003). The Blackwell Companion to Hinduism. Oxford: Blackwell. ISBN 0-631-21535-2. Archived from the original on 29 March 2024.
- Flood, Gavin (2003a). "Introduction: Establishing the Boundaries". In Flood, Gavin (ed.). The Blackwell Companion to Hinduism. Oxford: Blackwell.
- Flood, Gavin (2022). The Wiley Blackwell Companion to Hinduism.
- Fowler, Jeaneane D. (1997). Hinduism: Beliefs and Practices. Sussex Academic Press. ISBN 978-1-898723-60-8.
- Fuller, Christopher John (2004). The Camphor Flame: Popular Hinduism and Society in India. Princeton University Press. ISBN 978-0-691-12048-5.
- Ghurye, Govind Sadashiv (1980). The Scheduled Tribes of India. Transaction Publishers. ISBN 978-0-87855-308-2.
- Gomez, Luis O. (2013) [1987]. "Buddhism in India". In Kitagawa, Joseph M. (ed.). The Religious Traditions of Asia: Religion, History, and Culture. London: RoutledgeCurzon. pp. 3–40. ISBN 978-1-136-87590-8.
- Gonda, Jan (1975). "The Indian Religions in Pre-Islamic Indonesia and their survival in Bali". Handbook of Oriental Studies. Section 3. Southeast Asia, Religions. Leiden: Brill. pp. 1–47.
- Gosch, Stephen; Stearns, Peter (2007). Premodern Travel in World History. Routledge. pp. 88–99. ISBN 978-0-415-22941-8.
- Halbfass, Wilhelm (1988). India and Europe: An Essay in Understanding. State University of New York Press.
- Halbfass, Wilhelm (1991). Tradition and Reflection. SUNY Press. ISBN 978-0-7914-0361-7.
- Halbfass, Wilhelm (1995). Philology and Confrontation: Paul Hacker on Traditional and Modern Vedānta. SUNY Press.
- Hark, Lisa; DeLisser, Horace (7 September 2011). Achieving Cultural Competency. John Wiley & Sons.
- Harman, William (2004). "Hindu Devotion". In Rinehart, Robin (ed.). Contemporary Hinduism: Ritual, Culture, and Practice. ABC-CLIO. pp. 99–122. ISBN 978-1-57607-905-8.
- Harshananda, Swami (1989). "A Bird's Eye View of the Vedas". Holy Scriptures: A Symposium on the Great Scriptures of the World (2nd ed.). Mylapore: Sri Ramakrishna Math. ISBN 978-81-7120-121-1.
- Harvey, Andrew (2001). Teachings of the Hindu Mystics. Shambhala. ISBN 978-1-57062-449-0.
- Hatcher, Brian A. (2015). Hinduism in the Modern World. Routledge. ISBN 978-1-135-04631-6.
- Heesterman, Jan (2005). "Vedism and Brahmanism". In Jones, Lindsay (ed.). The Encyclopedia of Religion. Vol. 14 (2nd ed.). Macmillan Reference. pp. 9552–9553. ISBN 978-0-02-865733-2.
- Hefner, Robert W. (1989). Hindu Javanese: Tengger Tradition and Islam. Princeton, NJ: Princeton University Press. ISBN 978-0-691-09413-7.
- Heitzman, James; Worden, Robert L. (1996). India: a country study. Area handbook series. Federal Research Division, Library of Congress. ISBN 978-0-8444-0833-0. LCCN 96019266. Archived from the original on 29 December 2020.
- Hiltebeitel, Alf (2002) [1987]. "Hinduism". In Kitagawa, Joseph M. (ed.). The Religious Traditions of Asia: Religion, History, and Culture. London: RoutledgeCurzon. pp. 3–40. ISBN 0-7007-1762-5.
- Holberg, Dale, ed. (2000). Students' Britannica India. Vol. 4. Encyclopædia Britannica India. p. 316. ISBN 978-0-85229-760-5.
- Holdrege, Barbara A. (1996). Veda and Torah: Transcending the Textuality of Scripture. Albany, NY: SUNY Press. ISBN 978-0-7914-1639-6.
- Holm, Jean; Bowker, John (2001) [1994]. Sacred Place (pb.). Continuum. ISBN 978-0-8264-5303-7. ISBN 978-1-6235-6623-4
- Hopfe, Lewis M.; Woodward, Mark R. (2008). Religions of the World. Pearson Education. ISBN 978-0-13-606177-9.
- Howe, Leo (2001). Hinduism & Hierarchy in Bali. Oxford: James Currey. ISBN 978-0-85255-914-7.
- Isaeva, Natalia (1995). From Early Vedanta to Kashmir Shaivism. Albany, NY: SUNY Press. ISBN 978-0-7914-2449-0.
- Jain, Andrea (2015). Selling Yoga: from Counterculture to Pop culture. Oxford University Press. ISBN 978-0-19-939024-3. OCLC 878953765.
- Jacobsen, Knut A. (2013). Pilgrimage in the Hindu Tradition: Salvific Space. Routledge. ISBN 978-0-415-59038-9.
- Jones, Constance A.; Ryan, James D. (2007). Encyclopedia of Hinduism. Encyclopedia of World Religions. J. Gordon Melton, Series Editor. New York: Facts On File. ISBN 978-0-8160-5458-9.
- Kane, P. V. (1953). History of Dharmaśāstra: Ancient and Medieval Religious and Civil Law in India. Vol. 4.
- Kim, Sebastian (2005). In Search of Identity: Debates on Religious Conversion in India. Oxford University Press. ISBN 978-0-19-567712-6.
- King, Richard (1999). Orientalism and Religion: Post-Colonial Theory, India and "The Mystic East". Routledge.
- King, Richard (2001). Orientalism and Religion: Post-Colonial Theory, India and "The Mystic East". Taylor & Francis e-Library.
- Kinney, Ann R.; Klokke, Marijke J.; Kieven, Lydia (2003). Worshiping Siva and Buddha: The Temple Art of East Java. Honolulu: University of Hawaii Press. ISBN 978-0-8248-2779-3.
- Klostermaier, Klaus K. (1989). A Survey of Hinduism (1st ed.). SUNY Press. ISBN 978-1-4384-0934-4.
- Klostermaier, Klaus K. (1994). A Survey of Hinduism (2nd ed.). SUNY Press.
- Klostermaier, Klaus K. (2007). A Survey of Hinduism (3rd ed.). SUNY Press. ISBN 978-0-7914-7082-4.
- Klostermaier, Klaus K. (2010). A Survey of Hinduism (3rd ed.). SUNY Press. ISBN 978-0-7914-8011-3.
- Klostermaier, Klaus K. (5 July 2007a). "The Divine Presence in Space and Time – Murti, Tirtha, Kala". A Survey of Hinduism. SUNY Press. ISBN 978-0-7914-7082-4.
- Klostermaier, Klaus K. (2007b). Hinduism: A Beginner's Guide. Oneworld Publications. ISBN 978-1-78074-026-3.
- Klostermaier, Klaus K. (2014). A Concise Encyclopedia of Hinduism. Oneworld Publications. ISBN 978-1-78074-672-2.
- Knott, Kim (1998). Hinduism: A Very Short Introduction. Oxford University Press. ISBN 978-0-19-160645-8.
- Koller, John M. (1968). "Puruṣārtha as Human Aims". Philosophy East and West. 18 (4): 315–319. doi:10.2307/1398408. JSTOR 1398408.
- Kramer, Kenneth (1986). World Scriptures: An Introduction to Comparative Religions. Paulist Press. ISBN 978-0-8091-2781-8.
- Kramrisch, Stella (1976a). The Hindu Temple. Vol. 1. Motilal Banarsidass. ISBN 978-81-208-0223-0.
- Kramrisch, Stella (1976b). The Hindu Temple. Vol. 2. Motilal Banarsidass. ISBN 978-81-208-0224-7.
- Kurien, Prema (2006). "Multiculturalism and American Religion: The Case of Hindu Indian Americans". Social Forces. 85 (2): 723–741. doi:10.1353/sof.2007.0015. S2CID 146134214.
- Larson, Gerald (1995). India's Agony Over Religion. SUNY Press. ISBN 978-0-7914-2411-7.
- Larson, Gerald James (2009). "Hinduism". World Religions in America: An Introduction. Westminster John Knox Press. pp. 179–198. ISBN 978-1-61164-047-2.
- Leaf, Murray J. (2014). The Anthropology of Eastern Religions: Ideas, Organizations, and Constituencies. Lexington Books. ISBN 978-0-7391-9241-2.
- Lipner, Julius (1998). Hindus: Their Religious Beliefs and Practices. Psychology Press. ISBN 978-0-415-05182-8.
- Lingat, Robert (1973). The Classical Law of India. University of California Press. ISBN 978-0-520-01898-3.
- Lipner, Julius (2009). Hindus: their religious beliefs and practices (2nd ed.). Abingdon: Routledge. ISBN 978-0-203-86464-7. OCLC 812916971.
- Lochtefeld, James G. (2002a). The Illustrated Encyclopedia of Hinduism: A–M. The Rosen Publishing Group. ISBN 978-0-8239-3179-8. ISBN 978-0-8239-2287-1.
- Lochtefeld, James G. (2002b). The Illustrated Encyclopedia of Hinduism: N–Z. The Rosen Publishing Group. ISBN 978-0-8239-3180-4.
- Lockard, Craig A. (2007). Societies, Networks, and Transitions. Volume I: to 1500. Cengage Learning. ISBN 978-0-618-38612-3.
- Long, Jeffrey D. (2013). Jainism: An Introduction. I. B. Tauris.
- Lorenzen, David N. (1999). "Who Invented Hinduism?". Comparative Studies in Society and History. 41 (4): 630–659. doi:10.1017/s0010417599003084. JSTOR 179424. S2CID 247327484.
- Lorenzen, David N. (2002). "Early Evidence for Tantric Religion". In Harper, Katherine Anne; Brown, Robert L. (eds.). The Roots of Tantra. State University of New York Press. ISBN 978-0-7914-5306-3.
- Lorenzen, David N. (2006). Who Invented Hinduism: Essays on Religion in History. Yoda Press. ISBN 978-81-902272-6-1.
- Marsh, Donna (11 May 2015). Doing Business in the Middle East: A cultural and practical guide for all business professionals. Little, Brown Book Group. ISBN 978-1-4721-3567-4.
- McDaniel, June (2007). "Hinduism". In Corrigan, John (ed.). The Oxford Handbook of Religion and Emotion. Oxford University Press. ISBN 978-0-19-517021-4.
- Michael, Witzel (2004). "Kalash Religion (extract from 'The Ṛgvedic Religious System and its Central Asian and Hindukush Antecedents')" (PDF). In A. Griffiths; J. E. M. Houben (eds.). The Vedas: Texts, Language and Ritual. Groningen: Forsten. pp. 581–636.
- Michaels, Axel (2004). Hinduism: Past and Present. Translated by Harshav, Barbara. Princeton University Press. ISBN 978-0-691-08953-9.
- Michell, George (1988). The Hindu Temple: An Introduction to Its Meaning and Forms. University of Chicago Press. ISBN 978-0-226-53230-1.
- Monier-Williams, Sir Monier (1891). Brāhmanism and Hindūism, or, Religious Thought and Life in India: As Based on the Veda and Other Sacred Books of the Hindūs. J. Murray.
- Monier-Williams, Monier (1974). Brahmanism and Hinduism: or, Religious Thought and Life in India, as Based on the Veda and Other Sacred Books of the Hindus. Elibron Classics. Adamant Media Corporation. ISBN 978-1-4212-6531-5.
- Monier-Williams, Monier (2001) [1872]. English Sanskrit dictionary. Delhi: Motilal Banarsidass. ISBN 978-81-206-1509-0. Archived from the original on 29 December 2020.
- Muesse, Mark W. (2011). The Hindu Traditions: A Concise Introduction. Fortress Press. ISBN 978-0-8006-9790-7.
- Muller, Max (1859). A History of Ancient Sanskrit Literature. London: Williams and Norgate.
- Narayanan, Vasudha (2009). Hinduism. The Rosen Publishing Group. ISBN 978-1-4358-5620-2.
- Nath, Vijay (2001). "From 'Brahmanism' to 'Hinduism': Negotiating the Myth of the Great Tradition". Social Scientist. 29 (3/4): 19–50. doi:10.2307/3518337. JSTOR 3518337.
- Nicholson, Andrew J. (2010). Unifying Hinduism: Philosophy and Identity in Indian Intellectual History. South Asia across the disciplines. Vol. 3. Columbia University Press. ISBN 978-0-231-14986-0.
- Nicholson, Andrew (2013). Unifying Hinduism: Philosophy and Identity in Indian Intellectual History. Columbia University Press. ISBN 978-0-231-14987-7.
- Noble, Allen (1998). "South Asian Sacred Places". Journal of Cultural Geography. 17 (2): 1–3. doi:10.1080/08873639809478317.
- Nussbaum, Martha C. (2009). The Clash Within: Democracy, Religious Violence, and India's Future. Harvard University Press. ISBN 978-0-674-03059-6.
- Olivelle, Patrick (2009). Dharma: Studies in its Semantic, Cultural and Religious History. Motilal Banarsidass. ISBN 978-81-208-3338-8.
- Osborne, E. (2005). Accessing R.E. Founders & Leaders, Buddhism, Hinduism and Sikhism Teacher's Book Mainstream. Folens.
- Pande, Govind Chandra, ed. (2006). India's Interaction with Southeast Asia. History of Science, Philosophy and Culture in Indian Civilization, vol. 1, part 3. Delhi: Centre for Studies in Civilizations. ISBN 978-8187586241.
- Parpola, Asko (2015). The Roots of Hinduism. The Early Aryans and the Indus Civilization. Oxford University Press. ISBN 978-0-19-022693-0.
- Pennington, Brian K. (2005). Was Hinduism Invented?: Britons, Indians, and the Colonial Construction. Oxford University Press. ISBN 978-0-19-516655-2.
- Phuong, Tran Ky; Lockhart, Bruce (2011). The Cham of Vietnam: History, Society and Art. NUS Press. ISBN 978-9971-69-459-3.
- Prentiss, Karen Pechilis (2014). The Embodiment of Bhakti. Oxford University Press. ISBN 978-0-19-535190-3.
- Raju, P. T. (1989). Structural Depths of Indian Thought. SUNY Press. ISBN 978-1-4384-1678-6.
- Radhakrishnan, S. (1922). "The Hindu Dharma". International Journal of Ethics. 33 (1): 1–22. doi:10.1086/intejethi.33.1.2377174.
- Radhakrishnan, S.; Moore, C. A. (1967). A Source Book in Indian Philosophy. Princeton University Press. ISBN 978-0-691-01958-1.
- Radhakrishnan, S. (1996). Indian Philosophy. Vol. 1. Oxford University Press. ISBN 978-0-19-563820-2.
- Ramstedt, Martin, ed. (2004). Hinduism in Modern Indonesia: A Minority Religion Between Local, National, and Global Interests. London; New York: Routledge. ISBN 978-0-7007-1533-6.
- Renou, Louis (1964). The Nature of Hinduism. Walker.
- Richman, Paula (1988). Women, branch stories, and religious rhetoric in a Tamil Buddhist text. Buffalo, NY: Maxwell School of Citizenship and Public Affairs, Syracuse University. ISBN 978-0-915984-90-9.
- Rinehart, Robin (2004). Contemporary Hinduism: Ritual, Culture, and Practice. ABC-CLIO.
- Rocher, Ludo (1986). The Puranas. Otto Harrassowitz Verlag. ISBN 978-3-447-02522-5.
- Rocher, Ludo. "The Dharmasastra". In Flood (2003).
- "Shankara's Introduction". The Brīhād Aranyaka Upanishad. Translated by Roer, Edward. 1908.
- Samuel, Geoffrey (2008). The Origins of Yoga and Tantra: Indic Religions to the Thirteenth Century. Cambridge University Press. ISBN 978-0-521-69534-3.
- Samuel, Geoffrey (2010). The Origins of Yoga and Tantra. Indic Religions to the Thirteenth Century. Cambridge University Press.
- Sargeant, Winthrop; Chapple, Christopher (1984). The Bhagavad Gita. New York: State University of New York Press. ISBN 978-0-87395-831-8.
- Sen Gupta, Anima (1986). The Evolution of the Sāṃkhya School of Thought. South Asia Books. ISBN 978-81-215-0019-7.
- Sharma, Arvind (2000). Classical Hindu Thought: An Introduction. Oxford University Press. ISBN 978-0-19-564441-8.
- Sharma, Arvind (2002). "On Hindu, Hindustān, Hinduism and Hindutva". Numen. 49 (1): 1–36. doi:10.1163/15685270252772759. JSTOR 3270470.
- Sharma, Arvind (2003). The Study of Hinduism. University of South Carolina Press.
- Sharma, Arvind (2011). Hinduism as a Missionary Religion. SUNY Press. ISBN 978-1-4384-3211-3.
- Sharma, Suresh K.; Sharma, Usha (2004). Cultural and Religious Heritage of India: Hinduism. Mittal Publications. ISBN 978-81-7099-956-0.
- Siemens, Herman; Roodt, Vasti (2009). Nietzsche, Power and Politics: Rethinking Nietzsche's Legacy for Political Thought. Walter de Gruyter. ISBN 978-3-11-021733-9.
- Silverberg, James (1969). "Social Mobility in the Caste System in India: An Interdisciplinary Symposium". The American Journal of Sociology. 75 (3): 442–443. doi:10.1086/224812.
- Shukla, D. N. (1993). Vastu-Sastra: Hindu Science of Architecture. Munshiram Manoharial Publ. ISBN 978-81-215-0611-3.
- Singh, Kunj Bihari (2004) [1963]. "Manipur Vaishnavism: A Sociological Interpretation". In Rowena Robinson (ed.). Sociology of Religion in India. Themes in Indian Sociology, 3. New Delhi: Sage Publ. India. pp. 125–132. ISBN 0-7619-9781-4.
- Singh, Upinder (2008). A History of Ancient and Early Medieval India: From the Stone Age to the 12th Century. Pearson Education India. ISBN 978-81-317-1120-0.
- Sinha, Amita (1998). "Design of Settlements in the Vaastu Shastras". Journal of Cultural Geography. 17 (2). Taylor & Francis: 27–41. doi:10.1080/08873639809478319.
- Sjoberg, Andree F. (1990). "The Dravidian Contribution to the Development of Indian Civilization: A Call for a Reassessment". Comparative Civilizations Review. 23 (23): 40–74. Article 4. Archived from the original on 29 December 2020.
- Smart, Ninian (1993). "The Formation Rather Than the Origin of a Tradition". DISKUS. 1 (1): 1. Archived from the original on 2 December 2013.
- Smelser, Neil J.; Lipset, Seymour Martin, eds. (2005). Social Structure and Mobility in Economic Development. Aldine Transaction. ISBN 978-0-202-30799-2.
- Smith, Bonnie; Van De Mieroop, Marc; von Glahn, Richard; Lane, Kris (2012). Crossroads and Cultures, Combined Volume: A History of the World's Peoples. Macmillan. ISBN 978-0-312-41017-9.
- Smith, Brian K. (1998). "Questioning Authority: Constructions and Deconstructions of Hinduism". International Journal of Hindu Studies. 2 (3): 313–339. doi:10.1007/s11407-998-0001-9. JSTOR 20106612. S2CID 144929213.
- Smith, Wilfred Cantwell (1963) [1961]. The Meaning and End of Religion. New York: Macmillan – via archive.org.
- Sontheimer, Sunther-Dietz, ed. (1989). Hinduism Reconsidered. Manohar. ISBN 8173041989.
- Sponsel, Leslie Elmer (2012). Spiritual Ecology: A Quiet Revolution. ABC-CLIO.
- Stuart-Fox, David J. (2002). Pura Besakih: Temple, religion and society in Bali. Leiden: KITLV Press. ISBN 978-9067181464.
- Sweetman, Will (2004). "The prehistory of Orientalism: Colonialism and the Textual Basis for Bartholomaus Ziegenbalg's Account of Hinduism" (PDF). New Zealand Journal of Asian Studies. 6 (2): 12–38. Archived from the original (PDF) on 7 February 2013.
- Tattwananda, Swami (n.d.). Vaisnava Sects, Saiva Sects, Mother Worship. Calcutta: Nirmalendra Bikash Sen Gupta.
- Thapar, Romila (1989). "Imagined Religious Communities? Ancient History and the Modern Search for a Hindu Identity". Modern Asian Studies. 23 (2): 209–231. doi:10.1017/S0026749X00001049. S2CID 145293468.
  - Thapar, R. (1993). "Imagined Religious Communities? Ancient History and the Modem Search for a Hindu Identity". Interpreting Early India. Delhi: Oxford University Press. pp. 60–88.
- Thomas, T. (2012). Prasons, Gerald (ed.). The Growth of Religious Diversity – Vol 1: Britain from 1945 Volume 1: Traditions. Routledge.
- Thompson Platts, John (1884). A dictionary of Urdu, classical Hindī, and English. W. H. Allen & Co., Oxford University.
- Toropov, Brandon; Buckles, Luke (2011). The Complete Idiot's Guide to World Religions. Penguin.
- Truschke, Audrey (2023). "Hindu: A History". Comparative Studies in Society and History. 65 (2): 1–26. doi:10.1017/S0010417522000524. S2CID 256174694.
- Turner, Bryan S. (1996a). For Weber: Essays on the Sociology of Fate. SAGE Publications. ISBN 978-0-8039-7634-4.
- Varghese, Alexander P. (2008). India: History, Religion, Vision And Contribution To The World. Atlantic Publishers & Dist. ISBN 978-81-269-0904-9.
- Viswanathan, G (2003). "Colonialism and the Construction of Hinduism". In Flood, Gavin (ed.). The Blackwell Companion to Hinduism. pp. 23–44. doi:10.1002/9780470998694.ch2. ISBN 978-0-470-99869-4.
- Vivekananda, Swami (1987). Complete Works of Swami Vivekananda. Calcutta: Advaita Ashrama. ISBN 978-81-85301-75-4.
- Vivekjivandas (2010). Hinduism: An Introduction – Part 1. Ahmedabad: Swaminarayan Aksharpith. ISBN 978-81-7526-433-5.
- Walker, Benjamin (1968). The Hindu world: an encyclopaedic survey of Hinduism. Taylor & Francis. ISBN 978-0-429-62465-0.
- Werner, Karel (1998) [1977]. Yoga And Indian Philosophy. Motilal Banarsidass. ISBN 978-81-208-1609-1.
- Werner, Karel (2005). A Popular Dictionary of Hinduism. Routledge. ISBN 978-1-135-79753-9.
- West, Barbara A. (2010). Encyclopedia of the Peoples of Asia and Oceania. Infobase Publishing. ISBN 978-1-4381-1913-7.
- Widgery, Alban G. (January 1930). "The Principles of Hindu Ethics". International Journal of Ethics. 40 (2): 232–245. doi:10.1086/intejethi.40.2.2377977. JSTOR 2377977. S2CID 170183611.
- Wimberley, Edward T. (2009). Nested Ecology: The Place of Humans in the Ecological Hierarchy. JHU Press. ISBN 978-0-8018-9289-9.
- Witzel, Michael (1995). "Early Sanskritization: Origin and Development of the Kuru state" (PDF). Electronic Journal of Vedic Studies. 1 (4). Praeger. Archived from the original (PDF) on 11 June 2007.
- Zaehner, R. C. (1992). Hindu Scriptures. Penguin Random House. ISBN 978-0-679-41078-2. Archived from the original on 28 March 2024.
- Zimmer, Heinrich (1951). Philosophies of India. Princeton University Press.

Web sources
