= Twelve Auspicious Rites =

Traditional Burmese rites of passage

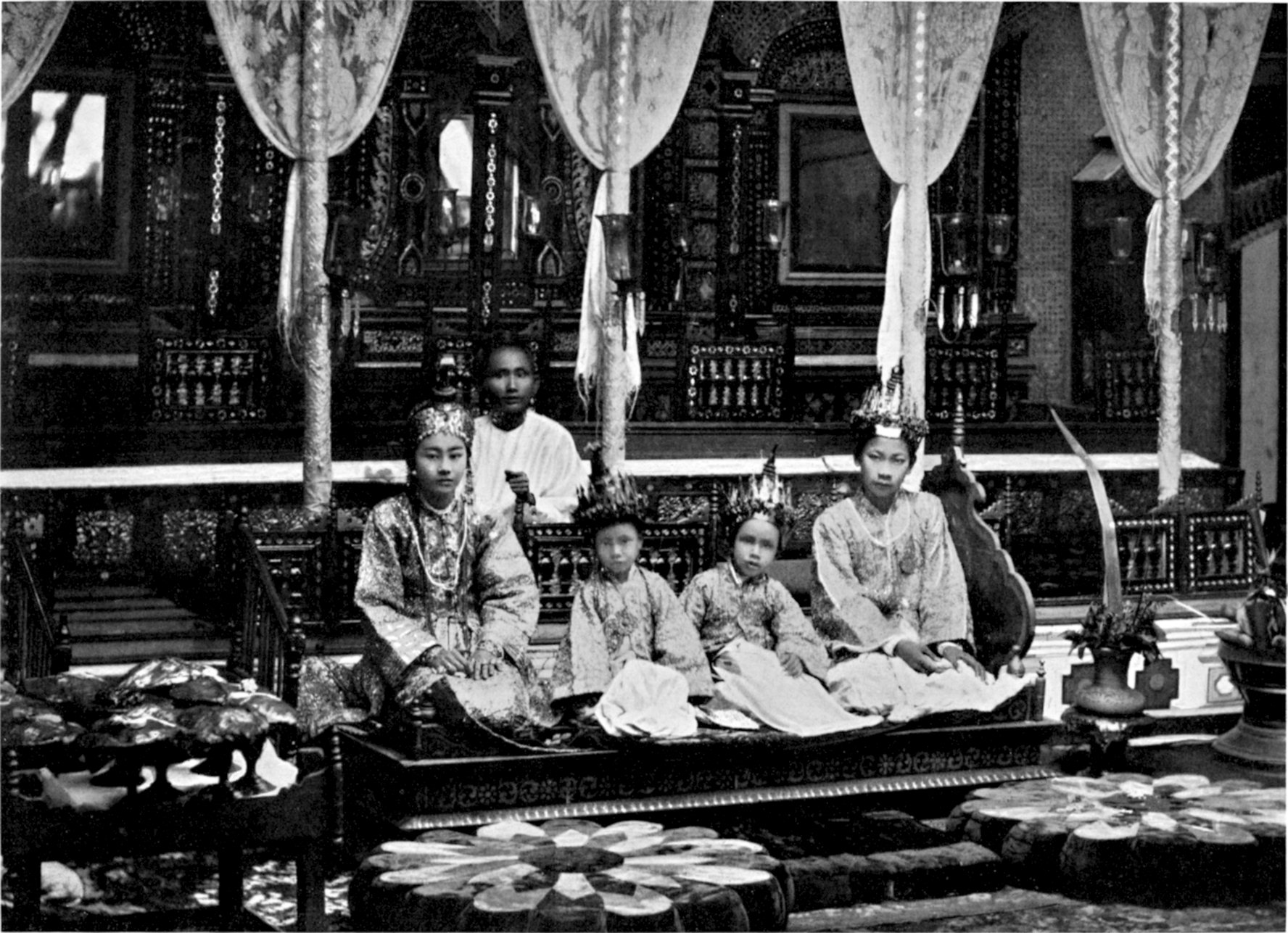
Girls dressed in ceremonial attire, ready to partake in the ear-boring rite, c. 1912.

The Twelve Auspicious Rites (Burmese: လောကီမင်္ဂလာဆယ့်နှစ်ပါး, လောကီမင်္ဂလာဆယ့်နှစ်ခန်း, and လောကီမင်္ဂလာဆယ့်နှစ်ဖြာ) are a series of worldly rites of passage recognized in traditional Burmese culture, particularly by the Bamar and Rakhine peoples. These are distinct from the Thirty-eight Buddhist Beatitudes described in the Maṅgala Sutta.

In modern times, only four or five of these rites — the naming, first feeding, ear-boring, shinbyu, and wedding rites — are commonly practiced in Myanmar, especially in urban cities. In pre-colonial Burma, Brahmins typically consecrated or led these rites. Today, masters of ceremony who specialize in abhisheka rituals, called beiktheik saya (ဘိသိက်ဆရာ), consecrate these rites. Beiktheik saya derive their skills from four Vedic scriptures, namely Sāmaveda, Yajurveda, Atharvaveda, and Rigveda, in addition to Pali scriptures. The Twelve Auspicious Rites are believed to have originated in India, and were later spread throughout Southeast Asia by Buddhist missionaries. The rites are based on the teachings of the Buddha and are intended to promote moral and spiritual development, as well as to help individuals attain enlightenment.

== List of rites ==
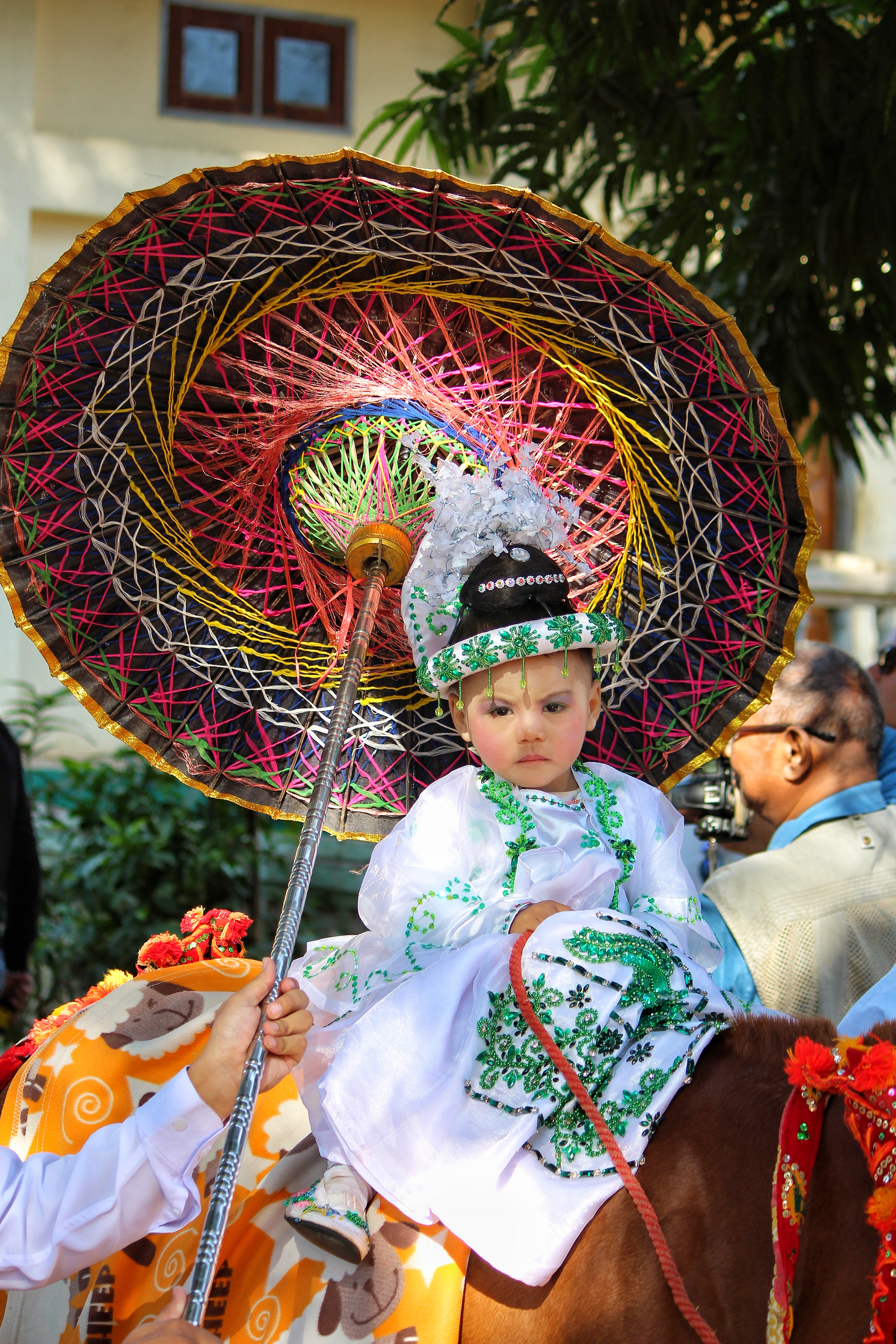
A young boy dressed in ceremonial costume, partaking in a shinbyu rite.

1. Vijāta Maṅgalā (ဝိဇာတမင်္ဂလာ) – the successful delivery of a child
2. Mukhadassana Maṅgalā (မုခဒဿနမင်္ဂလာ) – the taking of refuge in the Three Jewels, worship of the Nandimukha nat, and paying of obeisance to a child's grandparents on the third day of a child's birth (Note: Also called Nandīmukhadassana Maṅgalā (နန္ဒီမုခဒဿနမင်္ဂလာ).)
3. Kesacchedana Maṅgalā (ကေသစ္ဆေဒနမင်္ဂလာ) – the shaving of a child's hair on the 7th day of a child's birth
4. Dolākaraṇa Maṅgalā (ဒေါလာကရဏမင်္ဂလာ) – the first cradling of a child on an auspicious day (Note: "Dolā" (ဒေါလာ) is sometimes misspelt doḷā (ဒေါဠာ).)
5. Tambūlabhatta Maṅgalā (တမ္ဗူလဘတ္တမင်္ဂလာ) – the first ceremonial feeding of betel nut (flavored with catechu, licorice, and fennel seeds) to a child, on the 75th or 100th day of a child's birth (Note: Also called Tambūlāhāra Maṅgalā (တမ္ဗူလာဟာရမင်္ဂလာ). Now sometimes replaced with Sirodaka Maṅgalā (သိရောဒက), the child's first ceremonial hair-washing as betel nut has fallen out of common use.)
6. Ravindudassana Maṅgalā (ရဝိန္ဒုဒဿနမင်္ဂလာ) – the first revealing of a child to the sun and moon on the full moon day of the first, second, or third Burmese lunar months following a child's birth, comparable to the Hindu nishkramana ceremony
7. Nāmakaraṇa Maṅgalā (နာမကရဏမင်္ဂလာ) – the naming of a child based on a child's personalized horoscope (ဇာတာ) on the 100th day of a child's birth, similar to the Hindu namakarana ceremony
8. Bhattāhāra Maṅgalā (ဘတ္တာဟာရမင်္ဂလာ) – the first ceremonial feeding of solid food (steamed rice) to a child, also commemorated with the donation of food alms to Buddhist monks, on the 6th month of a child's birth, (Note: Also called Āhāraparibhoga Maṅgalā (အာဟာရပရိဘောဂမင်္ဂလာ, lit. 'enjoyment of food ceremony') or Paṭhamabhatta Maṅgalā (ပဌမဘတ္တမင်္ဂလာ, lit. 'first cooked rice ceremony').) similar to the Hindu annaprashana ceremony
9. Kesabandhana Maṅgalā (ကေသာဗန္ဓနမင်္ဂလာ) – the hair-knotting of a child, after the hair is shampooed with traditional herbal shampoo made with soap acacia and Grewia elastica (Tayaw kinbun) on an auspicious day
10. Kaṇṇavijjhana Maṅgalā (ကဏ္ဍဝိဇ္ဈနမင်္ဂလာ) – the ear-boring ceremony of a child an auspicious day, comparable to the Hindu karnavedha ceremony
11. Pabbajja Maṅgalā (ပဗ္ဗဇ္ဇမင်္ဂလာ) – shinbyu, the ordination of a child into the Buddhist monkhood as a samanera on an auspicious day (Note: Also called Sāmaṇerapabbajja Maṅgalā (သာမဏေရပဗ္ဗဇ္ဇမင်္ဂလာ).)
12. Āvāha Maṅgalā (အာဝါဟဝိဝါဟမင်္ဂလာ) – the wedding ceremony on an auspicious day (Note: Typically combined with the Vivāha Maṅgalā (ဝိဝါဟမင်္ဂလာ), the rite wherein the daughter is led to her family home before the wedding.)

The scholar Aung Chein also identifies a number of auspicious rites outside of the twelve listed above:

1. Bhūmyākaraṇa Maṅgalā (ဘူမျာကရဏမင်္ဂလာ) – the first touching of the ground by a child
2. Muttasirā Maṅgalā (မုတ္တသိရာမင်္ဂလာ) – the first parting of the child's hair by his or her mother
3. Makuṭabandhana Maṅgalā (မကုဋဗန္ဓနမင်္ဂလာ) – the wearing of the makuṭa crown
4. Gehakaraṇa Maṅgalā (ဂေဟကရဏမင်္ဂလာ) – the housewarming ceremony

== See also ==
- Awgatha
- Buddhābhiṣeka
- Culture of Myanmar
- Mingalaba
- Shinbyu
- Weddings in Myanmar
