= Wedding music =

Musical compositions intended for performance at marriage ceremonies

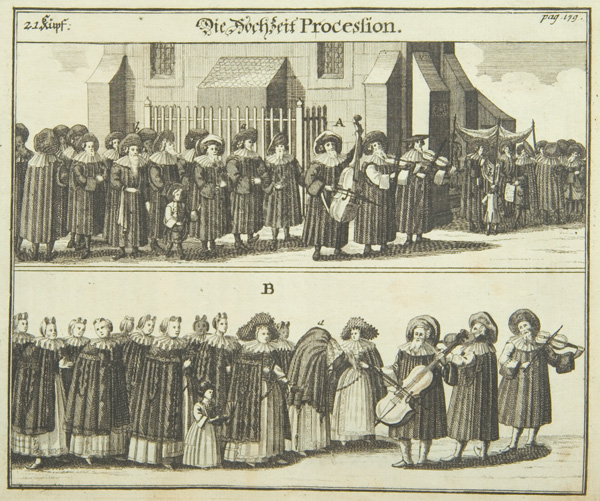
A Jewish wedding procession, 1724, from the book Juedisches Ceremoniel

Music is often played at wedding celebrations, including during the ceremony and at festivities before or after the event. The music can be performed live by instrumentalists or vocalists or may use pre-recorded songs, depending on the format of the event, traditions associated with the prevailing culture and the wishes of the couple being married.

There are many different styles of music that can be played during the entrance and ceremony. While some elements of the ceremony may be personalized for a specific couple, the order of service will most of the time follow a similar pattern.

== Prelude ==
A prelude often precedes the wedding. During the prelude, guests arrive to the gathering place while ambiance music is being played. Calm and light music is usually performed at that time, setting the mood for the ceremony while not being too distracting for the guests. Popular prelude music includes Air on the G string and Jesu, Joy of Man's Desiring by Johann Sebastian Bach.

== Entrance ==
Bridal march
The Bridal Chorus from Richard Wagner's opera Lohengrin

Music can be used to announce the arrival of the participants of the wedding (such as a bride's processional), and in many western cultures, this takes the form of a wedding march. For more than a century, the Bridal Chorus from Wagner's Lohengrin (1850), often called "Here Comes The Bride", has been the most popular processional, and is traditionally played on a pipe organ.

Some couples may consider traditional wedding marches clichéd and choose a more modern piece of music or an alternative such as Canon in D by Johann Pachelbel. Since the televised wedding of Charles, Prince of Wales and Lady Diana Spencer in 1981, there has been an upsurge in popularity of Jeremiah Clarke's "Prince of Denmark's March" for use as processional music; the piece was formerly (and incorrectly) attributed to Henry Purcell as Trumpet Voluntary.

At Jewish weddings, the entrance of the groom is accompanied by the tune Baruch Haba.

Traditional Burmese weddings incorporate songs from the Mahāgīta corpus. A bwe song called "Aura of Immeasurable Auspiciousness" (Burmese: အတိုင်းမသိမင်္ဂလာသြဘာဘွဲ့, Ataing Mathi Mingala Awba Bwe) is used as a wedding processional song in traditional Burmese weddings. The style of Mahāgīta songs has also been adapted in more modern compositions, such as "Auspicious Song" (Burmese: မင်္ဂလာတေး, Mingala Tei) composed by Twante Thein Tan, and "Akadaw Pei" (Burmese: အခါတော်ပေး) by Waing Lamin Aung, both of which are commonly played at traditional Burmese weddings.

In Egyptian culture, the zaffa (Egyptian Arabic: زفـّـة / ALA-LC: zaffah), or wedding march, is a musical procession of bendir drums, bagpipes, horns, belly dancers and men carrying flaming swords. This is an ancient Egyptian tradition that predates Islam.

Interfaith marriage ceremonies have benefited by the efforts of several modern composers, many of whom have written processional marches to honor the religious traditions of both the bride and the groom. Included in this group are John Serry Sr. (1968).

== Ceremony ==
During the service there may be a few hymns, especially in liturgical settings.

== Recessional ==
The exiting of the bridal party is also called the wedding recessional.

At the end of the service, in Western traditions, the bride and groom march back up the aisle to a lively recessional tune, a popular one being Felix Mendelssohn's Wedding March from A Midsummer Night's Dream (1842). The piece achieved popularity after it was played during the wedding of Victoria, Princess Royal to Prince Frederick William of Prussia in 1858. Another popular choice is Widor's Toccata from Symphony for Organ No. 5 (1880).

== Post ceremony ==
After the ceremony, there is often a celebratory dance, or reception, where there may be musical entertainment such as a wedding singer, live wedding band, or DJ to play songs for the couple and guests.

Siman Tov ("Good Tidings") is an all-purpose celebratory song in Jewish weddings.

In Zanzibar, Beni is performed both as a street parade and stationary as a wedding dance.

== See also ==
- Processional
- Recessional
