= Dodda Dayvara Jatre =

Dodda Dyavara Jatre is a fair conducted every 11 years in the town of Kolar, Karnataka. It is the festival of Kuruba Gowdas. It lasts usually for three days in either end of April or the beginning of May. The deities who are worshiped are Beereshwara, Battheshwara, Siddeshwara and Gurumurtheshwara. The temples dedicated to these deities are located in Kurubarapet, adjoining the Kolaramma Lake. The fair is attended by more than one hundred thousand people from Karnataka and neighbouring states of Andhra Pradesh and Tamil Nadu. The deities are taken in procession from Kurubarpet to the Antaragange hill and back; on the way the procession stops in front of all the temples, and the "Coconut Miracle" or Tenginakai Pavada is performed. This large number people camp on the dry bed of the Kolaramma lake, where they stay for the whole three days. The huge Kolaramma lake is usually dry during the jatre, as it coincides the time just before the start of monsoon rains and filling up of the lake. The festivities include Kuruba "kulastha mahakoota", "Naaga Devathe Thani", "Bilvarchane", "Meeludeepa Pooje" etc.

== Manchanabele, Chikkaballapura District ==
Manchanabele Dodda Dyavara Jatre is a three-day fair conducted every 7 years prominently by Kuruba community in Manchanabele village, Chikkaballapura district, Karnataka. The deities Beereshwara, Aanedevaru, Siddedevaru and Chowdeshwari are worshiped by thousands of people gathered from various parts of the state and neighboring states. The devotees perform various seve or services like Deepa arati seve, Thani seve, Ear piercing seve, Hair offering, Deities procession, Tengina kayi pavada, Veera chaati pavada and Hulivesha.
