= Marriage in Myanmar =

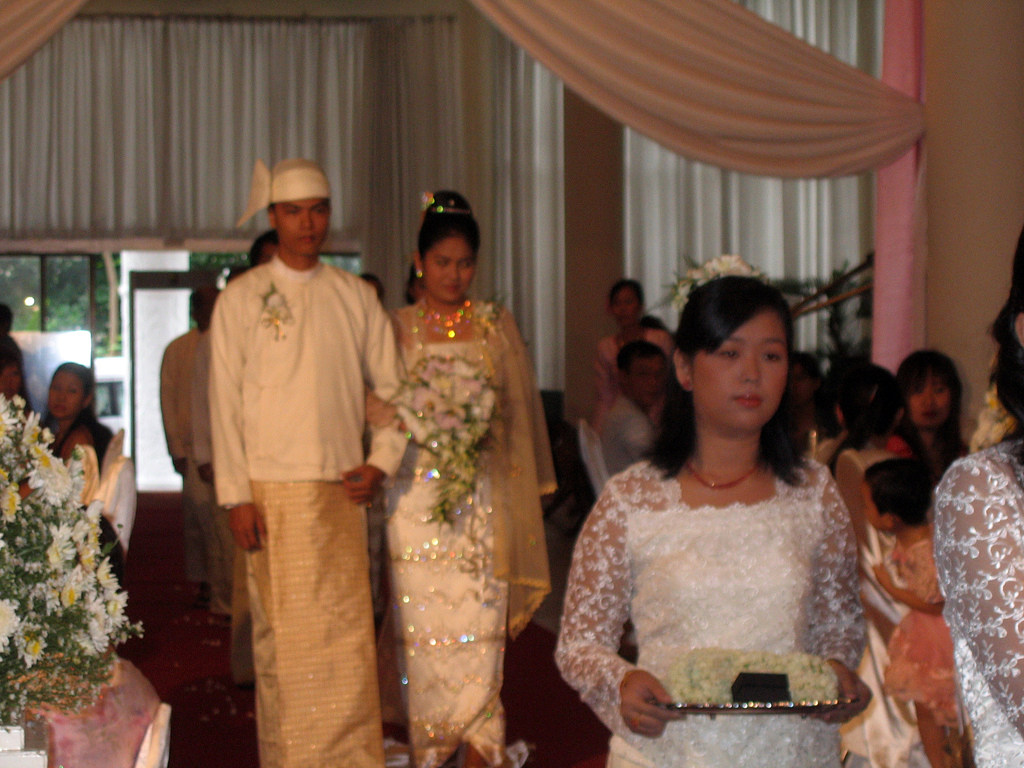
A wedding procession, with the groom and bride dressed in traditional Burmese wedding clothes, reminiscent of royal attire.

In the nation of Myanmar (Burma), certain customs are associated with the institution of marriage.

== Selecting a partner ==
Most Burmese people find their own life partner, but sometimes they may have an arranged marriage conducted by their parents or a middleman. If the parents do not support the couple, they may get married in secret then after some time the parents might accept their marriage. Traditionally, when a man goes to ask a woman's parents to bless their marriage, he brings a gift to his future wife.

Polygyny is illegal in Myanmar.

== Preparation ==
The first step to a proper engagement is for the bride and groom's parents and chosen elders to be formally and publicly introduced at the bride's home or a public venue. During that time, both sides will discuss the details of the wedding. However close they are, the families will formally negotiate about the wedding.

During the engagement celebration, the groom's family offers coconut, banana, and pickled tea leaves on a tray to the bride's family home for the household nat (spirit).

== Wedding ==
Myanmar is a predominantly Buddhist country, and many wedding customs and traditions are influenced by Buddhism. Historically, marriages could be announced to the public by letting people from seven houses on either side of the wedded couple's house know about it. Nowadays, people prefer to celebrate their wedding ceremony impressively among their community. Some couples sign the marriage certificate at a courthouse and some invite a judge to their home. Generally, monks are invited to home in rural areas. In metropolitan areas, families go monasteries. The couple offers food to the monks and listen to a sermon.

The best months to celebrate the wedding ceremony are April, May, June, October, November, and February. If a couple marries during these months, tradition holds that they will have a prosperous and long-lasting relationship. Couples try to avoid marrying during Buddhist Lent, from July to September.

Weddings in Myanmar are considered auspicious occasions in Burmese culture, reflect various ethnic, religious, and regional traditions. Depending on an individual's family social economic status, personal preferences and titles held, Burmese weddings can be religious or secular, and extravagant or simple. Wedding expenses are covered by the groom's family.

=== Bamar traditions ===
The wedding traditions of the Bamar people (Burmans), who comprise the majority of Myanmar's population, incorporate a number of rituals and practices. Weddings are considered one of the Twelve Auspicious Rites among the Bamar. Wedding expenses are typically borne by the groom's family. Dowries are typically unheard of, although arranged marriage is not a custom of the common Burmese, it is still practiced in the upper class society.

Traditional Burmese folklore considers love to be destiny, as the Hindu god Brahma writes one's destiny in love on a child's brow when they are six days old, called na hpuza (နဖူးစာ, lit. 'destiny on the forehead').

Buddhist monks are not present to conduct the wedding and solemnise the marriage, as they are forbidden to officiate weddings, which are considered a worldly affair (lokiya). However, they may be invited to bless the newly wed couple and recite a protective paritta. Typically, the bride and groom arrange an almsgiving feast called mingala hsun (မင်္ဂလာဆွမ်း) to monks the morning of the wedding.

Traditionally, a marriage is recognised with or without a ceremony when the man's longyi (sarong) is seen hanging from a rail of the house or if the couple eats from the same plate. A more extravagant wedding requires months of preparation, including consultation with an astrologer in choosing the most auspicious date and time in accordance with the Burmese calendar. The traditional Burmese months of Tagu, Kason, Nayon, Thadingyut, Tazaungmon, and Tabodwe are considered auspicious for weddings. Weddings are traditionally avoided during the Buddhist lent, which lasts three months from July to October.

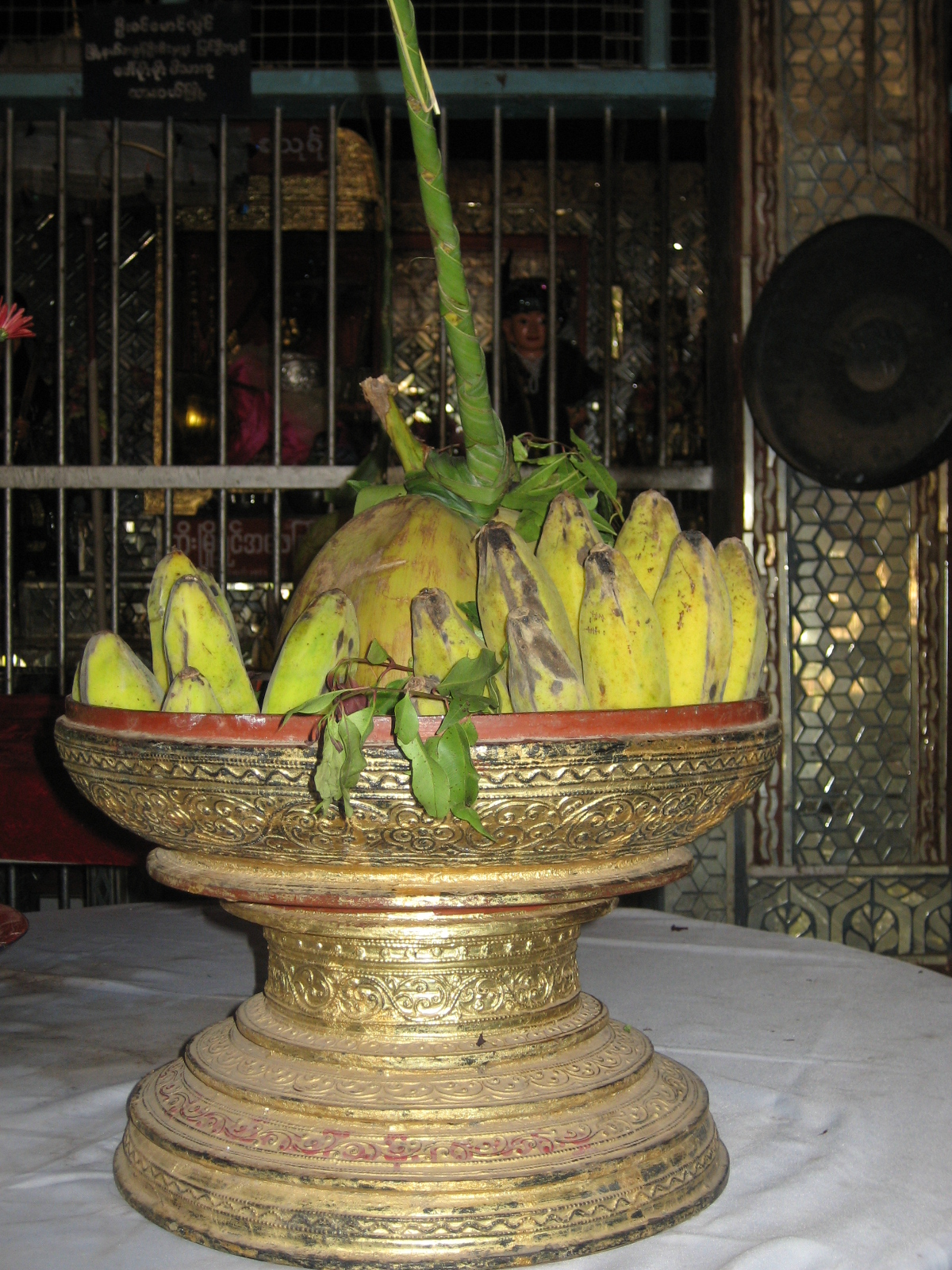
Ohn bwe ngapyaw bwe.

The groom's family formally asks the bride's family for their blessing by offering a receptacle of a green coconut with its stalk intact encircled by bunches of green bananas called ohn bwe ngapyaw bwe (ငှက်ပျောပွဲအုန်းပွဲ). The wedding details are negotiated between the families. Some Bamar families invite a spirit medium to protect the couple under the care of the household nat (spirit).

Also, a master of ceremonies (ဘိသိက်ဆရာ), typically a brahmin, consecrates the ceremony. More elaborate wedding receptions include entertainment from musicians, and the wedding is ended with a speech by a guest of higher social standing. In urban areas, wedding receptions tend to be held at hotels. In rural areas, wedding pavilions are temporarily erected to host the festivities. Gift-giving is an important element of Bamar weddings.

A traditional Bamar wedding ceremony is divided into seven chapters, namely:

1. Introduction or Paṇāma (ပဏာမခန်း)
2. Invoking the Buddha (ဘုရားပင့်ခန်း)
3. Gadaw of the Five Infinite Venerables (အနန္တငါးပါးကန်တော့ခန်း)
4. Principal Consecration Rites (မင်္ဂလာပြုခန်း, ပင်မအခန်း)
5. Veneration of the Devas (ဒေဝါပူဇနိယခန်း)
6. Admonishments (ဆုံးမခန်း)
7. Closing (မင်္ဂလာပွဲသိမ်းနိဂုံးချုပ်ခန်း)

Throughout the ceremony, the bride and groom sit on cushions next to each other. At the beginning of the wedding, the Brahmin blows a conch shell to commence the ceremony. Offerings of ohn bwe ngapyaw bwe, and six ceremonial trays containing rice, popcorn, grated betel nut and coconut, jasmine flowers, and red and white steamed glutinous rice cakes and 7 fried whole fish, are prepared for the ceremony. The couple pays obeisance to the Buddha, spirits and parents, holding a bouquet of eugenia sprigs and flowers chosen according to the birthdays of the couple. The master of ceremony joins the palms of the couple, wraps them in white cloth, and dips the joined palms in a silver or gold bowl. The Burmese word 'to marry' is let htat (လက်ထပ်), which literally means 'to join palms together.' After chanting a few Sanskrit mantras, the brahmin takes the couple's joined palms out of the bowl and blows the conch shell to end the ceremony.

The wedding processional at the beginning of the wedding ceremony is accompanied by a bwe song called "Aura of Immeasurable Auspiciousness" (အတိုင်းမသိမင်္ဂလာသြဘာဘွဲ့, Ataing Mathi Mingala Awba Bwe), which is drawn from Mahāgīta, the corpus of classical Burmese songs, and sung to the tune of a Burmese harp (saung). The aforementioned song is analogous to the "Bridal Chorus" used in Western weddings. The style of Mahāgīta songs has also been adapted in more modern compositions, such as "Auspicious Song" (မင်္ဂလာတေး, Mingala Tei) composed by Twante Thein Tan, and "Akadaw Pei" (အခါတော်ပေး) by Waing Lamin Aung, both of which are commonly played at traditional Burmese weddings.

There are ten commonly observed Bamar wedding rites:

1. Paso tan tin (ပုဆိုးတန်းတင်) – the groom's family visits the bride's family bearing wedding gifts, including a new longyi. The bride remains in her bedroom during the exchange of gifts, while the groom remains at his home. Afterwards, the groom's longyi or shawl is hung on a clothesline in another room to serve as the newlywed's new room, signifying the marriage.
2. Let son sa (လက်စုံစား) – the couple eat a morsel of cooked rice or snack from the same dish.
3. The couple exchanges wedding rings.
4. The groom visits the home of the bride's parents with a new set of longyi. The bride's family then bathes the groom and helps him change into the new set of clothes.
5. A master of ceremony joins the right hands of the couple in front of the invitees to solemnize the marriage.
6. Dali phwe (ဒါလီဖွဲ့) – the couple lower their heads as a gold or silver alloy necklace chain (4 cubits in length) and flower garlands are jointly hung over them.
7. Sulya yitpat (စုလျားရစ်ပတ်) – a white shawl called sulya (စုလျား), about 6 cubits long and 2 cubits wide, which is worn by the bride, is wrapped around the couple.
8. Pankon sut (ပန်းကုံးစွပ်) – the couple place floral garlands over each other.
9. The couple place their right hands, joined at the palm, into glass or silver bowls filled halfway with water and sprigs of Eugenia (သပြေ) and blades of Saccharum grass (နေဇာမြက်), signifying the establishment of a long lasting marriage. Their hands are wrapped with white cloth, over which perfumed water from a conch or ceremonial vessel, is poured.
10. The master of ceremony consecrates the wedded couple by dipping springs of Eugenia leaves into a gold or silver bowl and sprinkling the couple's foreheads with perfumed water.

=== Mon traditions ===
The Mon people have a number of unique wedding traditions. The groom's family traditionally bears the wedding costs. The wedding itself is preceded by an engagement ceremony, in which five elders from the bride's family host five sets of parents from the groom's family to negotiate the financial terms of the marriage, including a dowry. The parties also negotiate the details of the wedding ceremony, including the food to be served and the date. The Mon exclusively wed during the Burmese months of Tazaungmon and Tabaung. After the wedding details are finalized, young virgins are dispatched to invite wedding attendees in nearby areas, bearing wedding cards and gifts of betel nut or lahpet (pickled tea leaves).

In the lead-up to the wedding, the bride's family home, which serves as the ceremonial venue, is decorated. On the eve of the wedding, three virgins send gifts of pumpkin, coconut, papaya and khanom chin (vermicelli) to the bride's home, and the bride reciprocates the gifts with cigarettes. On the wedding day, the groom's family leads a procession to the bride's family home. The groom's eldest sister bears a gift basket containing a coconut sapling, areca palm, area nuts, betel leaves, pickled tea leaves, and household items including pepper, onion, rice, oil, and salt, while the youngest daughters carry lacquerware to the venue. Both the bride and groom are splashed with water using Eugenia leaves. The wedding ceremony continues with an exchange of gifts. Following the ceremony, the newlywed couple spend seven days in each other's family homes.

=== Rakhine traditions ===
The Rakhine people practice a wedding ceremony called thamet tet pwe (သမက်တက်ပွဲ, lit. 'ceremony of the son-in-law's ascent'). The groom dons a taungshay paso and gaung baung, while the bride wears an outfit including a htaingmathein jacket embroidered with celestial beings, birds, and a lion. A wedding table is set for the ceremony, sprinkled with paddy seeds and silver coins symbolizing prosperity and fertility. A platter of steamed sticky rice, signifying the couple's unity, is placed on the table. Atop the sticky rice are a pair of cooked prawns, fried whole fish, boiled duck eggs and sweet potatoes. The couple then don ceremonial wedding headdresses (ဦးသျှောင်). Holy thread is then encircled and tied around the wedding table nine times. The couple partake in offering morsels of food to their parents. Then, the bride and groom take off their headdresses. The groom places his headdress on the bride's head, solemnizing the wedding.

=== Chin traditions ===
The Chin people have a wide-ranging number of wedding traditions. The engagement is initiated by the groom's parents, who gift a bottle of alcohol to the bride's family in a rite called zuthawl pia. After negotiating the wedding details, a mopina ceremony is held to take the bride from her family home. The families haggle and exchange cash, and the bride's family equips their daughter with a basket, blanket, mattock, axe, and bottle (or in modern times, money and jewels). The introduction of Christianity has displaced some traditional Chin rites.

Among the Asho Chin, shamans called pasung saya officiate and organize traditional wedding ceremonies. In a significant wedding rite, a pig is slaughtered at dawn and its liver is extracted for examination. The pasung saya examines the liver to read the couple's future as a married couple.

== The married state ==
After marriage, a couple may live with their in-laws for a short time or for a lifetime. Household chores are carried out by women.

Husbands are traditionally “rice winners”; however, wives manage the family income. Sometimes wives supplement their husband's income by running a house-store, dress-making or selling something. When a Burmese woman marries, she does not need to transfer her property to her husband.

== Divorce and death ==
According to the United Nations Population Fund, divorce rates in Myanmar are low: 3 per cent of women and 2 per cent of men are divorced or separated. If a married woman divorces, she can keep what she has brought to the marriage. When a husband dies, everything he owns goes to his wife. Only after she dies does the property go to the children.
