= Vedarambha =

Hindu rite of passage

Vedarambha (Sanskrit: वेदारम्भ, romanized: Vedārambha) is a Hindu rite of passage in which an initiate begins his formal study of the Vedas. It is generally regarded to be the tenth of the sixteen sacraments known as the samskaras, though it is sometimes also offered a different position.

== Description ==
Vedarambha is prescribed to be performed during the ritual of receiving the sacred thread, known as the Upanayana, or up to a year following this occasion. A guru, a preceptor, teaches the Gayatri Mantra to the initiate, and the latter chants it to be blessed with wisdom. The guru offers a Vedic education to the initiate, which may accompany his general education. He is also taught the sandhya, the daily rituals, and a number of religious observances.
