= Keshanta =

Hindu rite of passage for young male

Keshanta (Sanskrit: केशान्त, Keśānta) (literally, cutting the hair) is the thirteenth of the sixteen saṃskāras (sacraments) practiced by the Hindus. This saṃskāra is connected with the first shaving of a student's beard when his age is about 16 years. The procedure of this saṃskāra is almost the same as that of the Chudakarana. This saṃskāra was also known as the Godana (giving a cow) or the Godanakarman (rite of giving a cow), as the student offered a cow to the teacher at the end of the ceremony. According to the Manusmriti (II.65), this saṃskāra should be performed for a Brahmin in the sixteenth year (from conception), for a Kshatriya in the twenty-second year and for a Vaishya in the twenty-fourth year.
