= Samskara (rite of passage) =

Rites of passage described in ancient Sanskrit texts

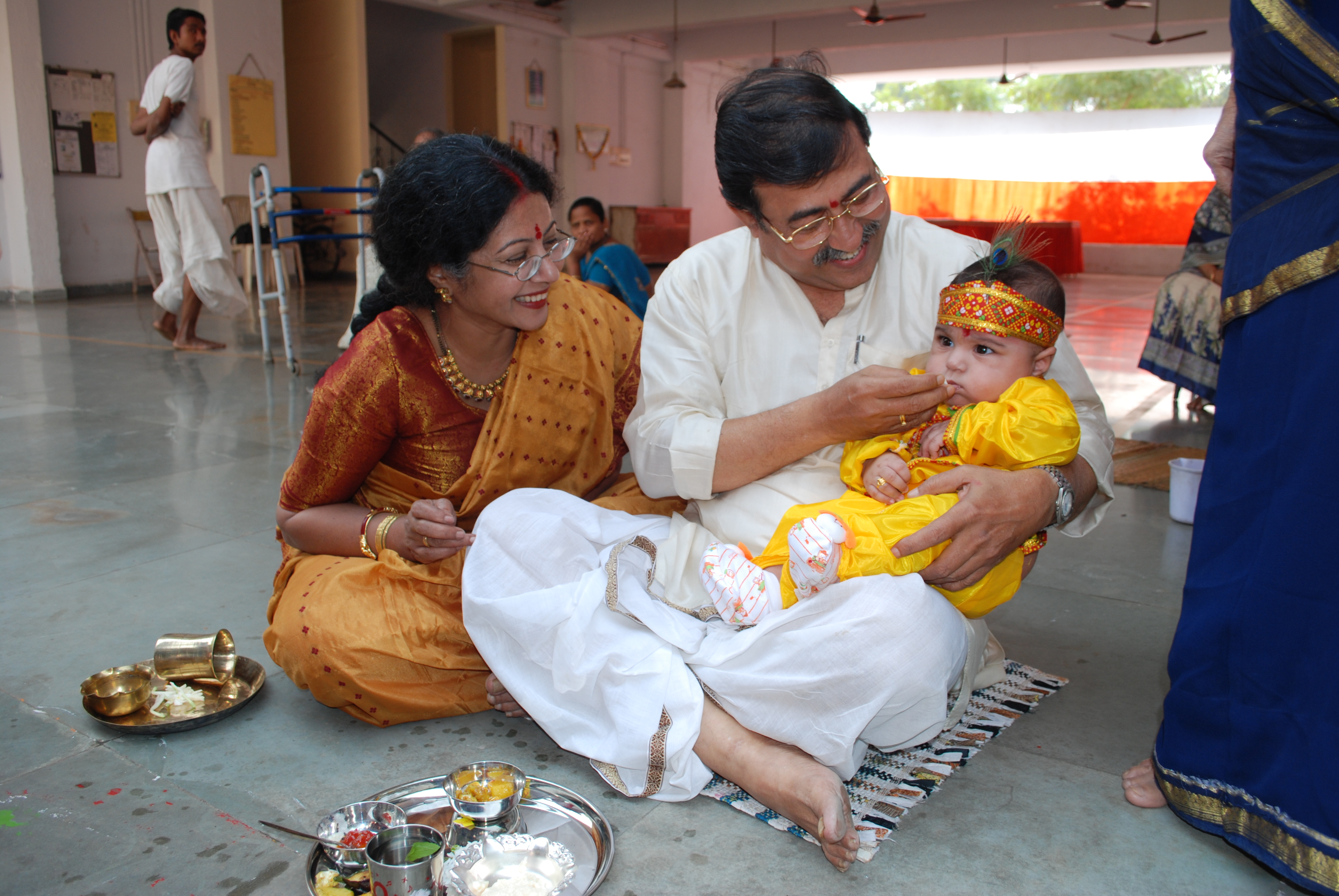
Samskaras are, in one context, the diverse rites of passage of a human being from conception to cremation, signifying milestones in an individual's journey of life in Hinduism. Above is annaprashana samskara celebrating a baby's first taste of solid food.

Samskara (Sanskrit: संस्कार, IAST: saṃskāra, sometimes spelled samskara) are diverse rites of passage in Hinduism, Jainism, Buddhism and Sikhism. The word literally means "putting together, making perfect, getting ready, to prepare", or "a sacred or sanctifying ceremony" in ancient Sanskrit and Pali texts of India.

In Hinduism, samskaras vary in number and details according to regional traditions. They range from the list of 40 samskaras in the Gautama Dharmasutra from about the middle of the 1st millennium BCE, to 16 samskaras in the Grhyasutra texts from centuries later. The list of samskaras in Hinduism includes both external rituals like marking a baby's birth and a baby's name giving ceremony, alongside inner rites of resolutions and ethics, like compassion towards all living beings and a positive attitude.

Samskara in Indian philosophy or saṅkhāra (Buddhism) is also a concept in the karma theory of Indian philosophies. According to various schools of Hindu philosophy, like the Yoga school, it refers to dispositions, characters or behavioral traits that exist as defaults from birth or are developed by a person over one's lifetime, with them existing as imprints on the subconscious. These perfected or default imprints of karma within a person, influence that person's nature, responses and states of mind.

== Etymology and meaning ==
Saṃskāra (Sanskrit: संस्कार) has various context-driven meanings, that broadly refer to "the putting together, accomplishing well, making perfect, a form of solemn recognition and getting ready, engaging in works and acknowledging the purification of the body by cleansing or the mind by education or an object by a process (such as polishing a gem or refining a metal)". The term appears in the Śrutis, and in the Smritis of diverse schools of Hinduism as well as in the texts of Jainism, Buddhism and Sikhism. The etymological roots of the word samskara when it refers to rites of passage, also mean "preparation, purifying, perfecting" from one's past state to one's future state.

The word samskara is rare in the oldest layer of Vedic literature, but its roots sam and kr occur often enough. The word appears in the Rig Veda hymns 6.28.4 and 8.33.9, as well as in other Vedic texts, where the context suggests it simply means "purify, prepare". It appears in the Jaimini Purvamimamsa-sutra (500-200 BCE) many times, where it again means "prepare, perfect, polish" something, either through action, speech or mind. In sections 3.8.3, 9.3.25 and 10.2.49 of the Jaimini Purvamimamsa-sutra, the word samskara is used to describe actions such as "washing the teeth, shaving the head, cutting nails, sprinkling water" as part of a ceremony. Samskara is defined by the ancient Indian scholar Shabara as, "that which prepares a certain thing or person fit for a certain purpose". Another ancient text Viramitrodaya defines samskara, notes Kane, as "a peculiar excellence due to the performance of certain actions which resides in the soul or the body of the actor".

Samskara in Hindu traditions, states Kane, refers to ceremonies, expressing outward symbols or signs of inner change and marking life events of significance. They served a spiritual, cultural and psychological purpose, welcoming an individual into a stage of life, conferring privileges on the individual(s), expecting duties from the individual, and impressing on the individual as well individual's social circle of their new role.

Sanskāra, in modern usage, is sometimes used to mean "cultural, social or religious heritage".

== Rites of passage ==
Samskaras in Hinduism are rites of passage that begin with one's birth, celebrate certain early milestones in a baby's growth and their welcome into the world in the presence of friends and family. They continue through to various stages of life like the first learning day, graduation from school, wedding and honeymoon, pregnancy, and raising a family, as well as the final rites associated with cremation. These rites of passage are not the same, and vary within the diverse traditions of Hinduism. Some may involve formal ceremonies like yajna (fire) ceremonies with the chanting of Vedic hymns. Others are simple, private affairs involving a couple, with or without friends, other families or a religious person like a priest or a pandit.

Samskaras are rites of passage that mark an individual's transition from one significant stage in their life to another, with them also providing social recognition. Various elements of samskaras and rituals of passage are mentioned in the Vedas of Hinduism, one of the oldest known scriptures in the world. The most extensive, but divergent discussions of these rites of passage are found in the numerous Dharmasutras and Grhyasutras from the 1st millennium BCE. Many of these rites of passage include formal ceremonies, with ritual readings of hymns, chants and ethical promises, aiming to orient the individual(s) to that which is considered part of dharma (right, good, just, moral, true, spiritual, responsible, duties to family members or society in general), and essential actions such as those associated with last rites and cremation, charitable works, or acts performed out of sraddha or expressions of faith.

=== Purpose ===
Gautama Dharmasutra lists "forty outer karma samskaras" and "eight inner karma samskara (good qualities)", which have the purpose of empowering a human being to discover, recognize and reach union with the Brahma-Atman (their Soul, Self, Highest Being). The ultimate purpose is to instil virtues, and samskaras are viewed in the Hindu tradition as means – not as ends – towards ripening and perfecting the human journey of life. The eight good qualities listed by Gautama Dharmasutra are emphasized as more important than the forty samskara rituals, in verses 8.21-8.25, as follows,

[...] (8.14-8.20)
These are the forty sanskara (sacramentary rites). (8.21)

Next, the eight virtues of the self: (8.22)
Compassion towards all creatures, patience, lack of envy, purity, tranquillity, having a positive disposition, generosity, and lack of possessiveness. (8.23)
A man who has performed the forty sanskaras but lacks these eight virtues does not obtain union with Brahman. (8.24)
A man who may have performed only some of the forty sanskaras but possesses these eight virtues, on the other hand, is sure to obtain union with Brahman. (8.25)

— Gautama Dharma-sutras, Verses 8.14-8.25, Translated by Patrick Olivelle

=== The 40 Samskaras ===
The Gautama Dharmasutra list the following forty rituals as outer samskaras:

- Garbhadhana (conception), Pumsavana (rite celebrating the fetus), Simantonnayana (parting of pregnant woman's hair in 8th month), Jatakarman (rite celebrating the birth), Namakarana (naming the child), Annaprashana (baby's first feeding of solid food), Choulam (baby's first haircut, tonsure), and Upanayana (entry into school rite);
- the four vows associated with Vedic study;
- graduation ritual at the conclusion of school;
- marriage sva-dharma rite;
- five sacrifices to gods, ancestors, humans, spirits, and all knowledge;
- seven remembrances and donations (sacrifices) using cooked food, in the form of ancestral offerings
- seven remembrances and donations (sacrifices) in the presence of fire (yajna), to mark harvests, seasons and deities
- seven kinds of Soma sacrifices: agnistoma, atyagnistoma, ukthya, sodasin, vajapeya, atiratra and aptoryama.

To obtain union with Brahman, one must also possess the eight virtues which are compassion, patience, non-envy, purity of thought speech and body, inner calm and peace, positive attitude, generosity, and lack of possessiveness.

=== The 16 samskaras ===
There are diverse number of samskaras in Hinduism, varying by texts between 12 and 18 in the Grhyasutras (Kalpa sastras). Of these, 16 are referred to as "Shodasha Samskaras" (Ṣoḍaśa Saṃskāra).

==== Intent to have a child ritual, Garbhadhana ====
Garbhadhana (IAST: Garbhādhāna, Sanskrit: गर्भाधान), also called Garbhalambhanam, literally means attaining the wealth of the womb. It is a private rite of passage, marking the intent of a couple to have a child. It is a ceremony performed before conception and impregnation. In some ancient texts, the word simply refers to the rite of passage where the couple have sex to have a child, and no ceremonies are mentioned. Scholars trace this rite to Vedic hymns, like those in sections 8.35.10 through 8.35.12 of the Rigveda, where repeated prayers for progeny and prosperity are solemnized,

प्रजां च धत्तं द्रविणं च धत्तम्
bestow upon us progeny and affluence

— Rig Veda 8.35.10 - 8.35.12, Translated by Ralph Griffith

The Vedic texts have many passages, where the hymn celebrates the desire for having a child, without specifying the gender of the child. For example, the Rigveda in section 10.184 states,

विष्णुर्योनिं कल्पयतु त्वष्टा रूपाणि पिंशतु । आ सिञ्चतु प्रजापतिर्धाता गर्भं दधातु ते ॥१॥
गर्भं धेहि सिनीवालि गर्भं धेहि सरस्वति । गर्भं ते अश्विनौ देवावा धत्तां पुष्करस्रजा ॥२॥
हिरण्ययी अरणी यं निर्मन्थतो अश्विना । तं ते गर्भं हवामहे दशमे मासि सूतवे ॥३॥
May Vishnu construct the womb, may Twashtri fabricate the member, may Prajapati sprinkle the seed, may Dhatri cherish thy embryo;
Sustain the embryo Sinivali, sustain the embryo Saraswati, may the divine Aswins, garlanded with lotuses, sustain thy embryo;
We invoke thy embryo which the Aswins have churned with the golden pieces of Arani (firewood), that thou mayest bring it forth in the tenth month.

— Rig Veda 10.184.1 - 10.184.3, Translated by HH Wilson

The desire for children, without mentioning gender, is in many other books of the Rigveda, such as the hymn 10.85.37. The Atharva Veda, similarly in verse 14.2.2, states a ritual invitation to the wife, by her husband to mount the bed for conception, "being happy in mind, here mount the bed; give birth to children for me, your husband". Later texts, such as the Brihadaranyaka Upanishad, in the last chapter detailing the education of a student, include lessons for his Grihastha stage of life. There, the student is taught, that as a husband, he should cook rice for the wife, and they together eat the food in certain way depending on whether they wish for the birth of a daughter or a son, as follows,

And if a man wishes that a learned daughter should be born to him, and that she should live to her full age, then after having prepared boiled rice with sesamum and butter, they should both eat, being fit to have offspring.

And if a man wishes that a learned son should be born to him, and that he should live his full age, then after having prepared boiled rice with meat and butter, they should both eat, being fit to have offspring.

— Brihadaranyaka Upanishad 6.4.17 - 6.4.18, Translated by Max Muller

According to Shankaracharya, rather than meat the inner pulp of two fruits is cooked with rice.

The different Grhyasutras differ in their point of view, whether the garbhadhana is to be performed only once, before the first conception, or every time before the couple plan to have additional children. To answer this question, the medieval era texts of various schools discussed and offered diverse views on whether the ritual is a rite of passage for the baby's anticipation in the womb (garbha), or for the wife (kshetra). A rite of passage of the baby would imply that Garbhadhana samskara is necessary for each baby and therefore every time the couple intend to have a new baby, while a rite of passage of the wife would imply a one time ritual suffices.

==== Nurturing the fetus rite, Pumsavana ====
Pumsavana (IAST: puṃsavana, Sanskrit: पुंसवन) is a composite word of Pums + savana. Pums as a noun means "a man, a human being, a soul or spirit", while savana means "ceremony, rite, oblation, festival". Pumsavana literally means "rite for a strong or male baby", usually translated as "nurturing a male fetus, bringing forth a male baby". It is a ritual conducted at the start of pregnancy, typically in or after the third month of pregnancy and usually before the fetus starts moving in the womb. The ceremony celebrates the rite of passage of the developing fetus, marking the stage where the baby begins to kick as a milestone in a baby's development.

The roots of the pumsavana ritual are found in section 4.3.23 and 4.6.2 of the Atharva Veda, wherein charms are recited for a baby boy. The Atharva Veda also contains charms to be recited for the birth of a child of either gender and the prevention of miscarriages, such as in section 4.6.17.

The ritual is performed in diverse ways, but all involve the husband serving something to the expectant wife. In one version, she is fed a paste mixture of yoghurt, milk and ghee (clarified butter) by him. In another version, the pumsavana ritual is more elaborate, done in the presence of yajna fire and vedic chants, where the husband places a drop of Banyan leaf extract in the wife's right nostril for a son, and her left nostril for a daughter, followed by a feast for all present.

The time prescribed for the pumsavana differs in different Grhyasutras, and can be extended up to the eighth month of pregnancy, according to some.

==== Parting hair and baby shower, Simantonnayana ====
Simantonnayana (IAST: Sīmantonnayana, Sanskrit: सीमन्तोन्नयन), also called Simanta or Simantakarana, literally means "parting the hair upwards". The significance of the ritual is to wish a healthy development of the baby and safe delivery to the mother.

Simantonnayana ritual is described in many Gryhasutra texts, but Kane states that there is great divergence in details, which may be because the rite of passage emerged in more a recent era, before it receded into the background. The texts do not agree on whether this rite of passage was to be celebrated before or after pumsavana, early or late stage of pregnancy, or the nature of ritual celebrations. The texts also disagree whether Simantonnayana was a rite of passage of the baby or of the pregnant woman, the former implying it must be repeated for every baby while the latter implying it was to be observed once for the woman with her first pregnancy.

The common element was the husband and wife getting together, with friends and family, then he parts her hair upwards at least three times. In modern times, the "parting hair" rite of passage is rarely observed, and when observed it is called Atha-gulem and done in the 8th month, with flowers and fruits, to cheer the woman in the late stages of her pregnancy. The ritual has more commonly evolved into a ritual that shares characteristics of a baby shower, where the friends and relatives of the woman meet, acknowledge and satisfy the food cravings of the expectant woman, and give gifts to the mother and the baby in the seventh or eighth month of pregnancy. Yåjñavalkya Smriti verse 3.79 asserts that the desires of the pregnant woman should be satisfied for healthy development of the baby, to prevent miscarriage and her health. After the Simantonnayana ritual or in the last months of the pregnancy, the woman is expected to not overexert herself, her husband is expected to be by her and not to travel to distant lands. This rite of passage is regionally called by various names, such as Seemant, Godh bharai, Seemantham or Valaikaapu.

==== Childbirth ceremony, Jatakarman ====
Jātakarman literally means "rite of a new-born infant". It is a rite of passage that celebrates the birth of the baby. It is the first post-natal rite of passage of the new born baby. It signifies the baby's birth, as well as the bonding of the father with the baby. In Hindu traditions, a human being is born at least twice – one at physical birth through mother's womb, and second at intellectual birth through teacher's care, the first is marked through Jatakarman samskara ritual, the second is marked through Vidyarambha or Upanayana samskara ritual. During a traditional Jātakarman ritual, the father welcomes the baby by touching the baby's lips with honey and ghee (clarified butter), as Vedic hymns are recited. The first significance of the hymns is medhajanana (Sanskrit: मेधाजनन), or to initiate the baby's mind and intellect in the womb of the world, after the baby's body formation has completed in the womb of the mother. The second part of the hymns wish the baby a long life.

The Brihadaranyaka Upanishad, in the last chapter detailing lessons for Grihastha stage of life for a student, describes this rite of passage, in verses 6.4.24 to 6.4.27, as follows,

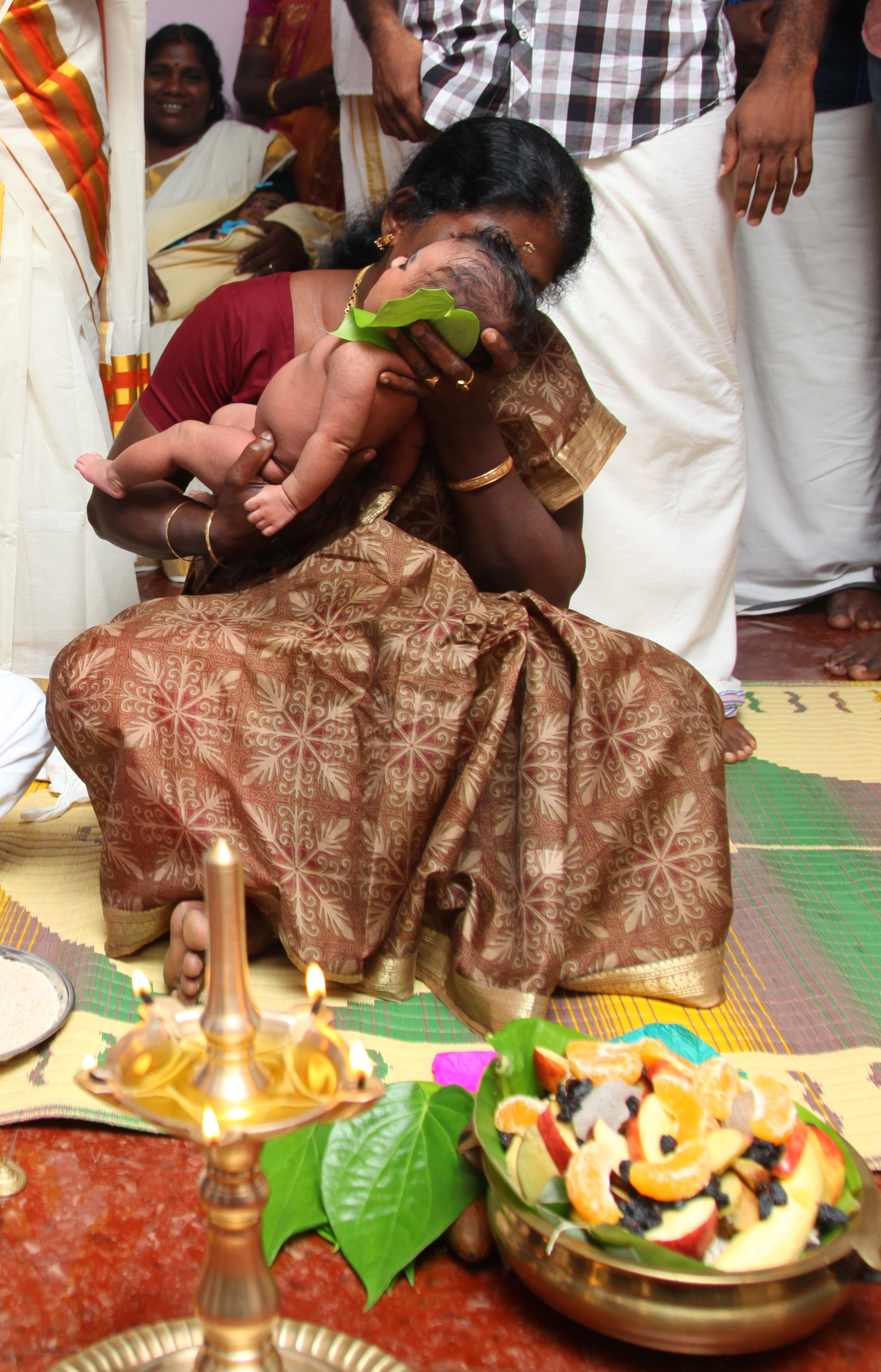
A new born's Namakarana ceremony. The grandmother is whispering the name into the baby's ear, while friends and family watch.

When a child is born, he prepares the fire, places the child on his lap, and having poured Prishadajya of Dahi (yoghurt) and Ghrita (clarified butter), into a metal jug, he sacrifices the mix into the fire, saying:
"May I, as I prosper in this my house, nourish a thousand ! May fortune never fail in its race, with offspring and cattle, Svah !
I offer to thee [the baby] in my mind the vital breaths which are in me, Svah !
Whatever in my work I have done too much, or whatever I have done too little, may the wise Agni make it right, make it proper, Svah !"

— Brihadaranyaka Upanishad 6.4.24

The Upanishad includes prayer to deity Saraswati during this rite of passage, the goddess of knowledge and wisdom in Hindu tradition. It also includes the threefold repetition of "Speech Speech" with the assertion to the baby, "You are the Vedas! so, live a hundred autumns", into the baby's ear by the father. At the end of the ritual pronouncements by the father, he gives the baby to the mother's breast for feeding.

While the earliest Dharmasutras list Jatakarma and Namakarama as two different samskara, they evolve into one in many Gryhasutra texts. By Pantanjali's time, these two rites of passage had merged into one, and completed within the first two weeks of the baby's birth, usually about the tenth day.

==== Naming the baby ritual, Namakarana ====
Namakarana (IAST: Nāmakaraṇa, Sanskrit: नामकरण) literally means "ceremony of naming a child". This rite of passage is usually done on the eleventh or twelfth day after birth, and sometimes the first new moon or full moon day after the tenth day of birth. On the day of this samskara, the infant is bathed and dressed in new garments. His or her formal name, selected by the parents, is announced. The naming ritual solemnizes the child as an individual, marking the process by which a child is accepted and socialized by people around him or her. The Satapatha Brahmana verse 6.1.3.9 asserts that the naming ceremony is a cleansing ceremony for the baby. The rite of passage also includes a gathering of friends and relatives of the new parents, where gifts are presented, and a feast follows.

The ancient Sanskrit texts provide numerous and divergent guidelines to the parents for choosing names. Most recommend that the boy's name be two or four syllables, starting with a sonant, a semivowel in the middle, and ending in a visarga. A girl's name is recommended to be an odd number of syllables, ending in a long ā or ī, resonant and easy to pronounce. Unpleasant, inauspicious, or words that easily transform into bad or evil words must be avoided, state the Gryhasutras, while the preferred names are those affiliated with a deity, virtues, good qualities, lucky stars, constellation, derivatives of the name of the father, or mother, or the place of birth, or beautiful elements of nature (trees, flowers, birds).

==== Baby's first outing, Nishkramana ====
Nishkramana (IAST: Niṣkrāmaṇa, Sanskrit: निष्क्रम) literally means "going out, coming forth", is the rite of passage where the parents take the baby outside the home and the baby formally meets the world for the first time. It is usually observed during the fourth month after birth. On this ritual occasion the newborn is taken out and shown the sun at sunrise or sunset, or the moon, or both. Alternatively, some families take the baby to a temple for the first time. The rite of passage involves bathing the baby and dressing him or her in new clothes. The baby's outing is accompanied by both the mother and the father, siblings if any, as well some nearby loved ones, such as grandparents and friends.

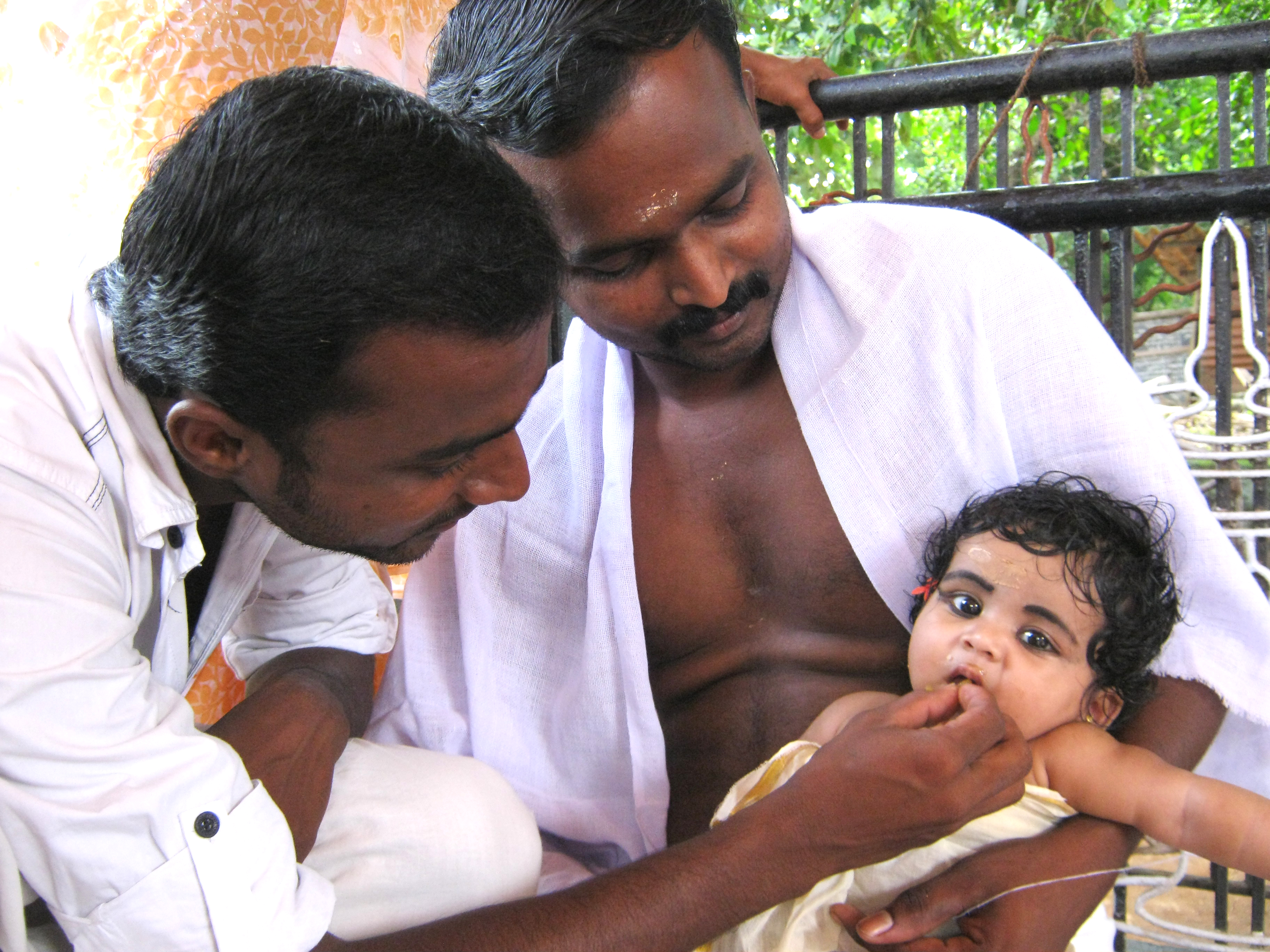
Annaprashanam is the rite of passage where the baby is fed solid food for the first time. The ritual has regional names, such as Choroonu in Kerala.

The significance of Niskramana and showing the baby heavenly bodies is derived from their significance of Sun, Moon and nature in the Vedic literature. At the time the baby is present before the sunrise or moon, it is the father who holds the baby and recites a hymn that means, "the brilliant sun has risen in the east, he is like the hamsa (swan) of the pure worlds, let us salute him, because he dispels darkness". When the baby is in presence of the moon, the father says, "O Moon, thou whose hair is well parted, let this child come to no harm, nor torn from the mother".

==== Baby's first solid food, Annaprashana ====
Annaprashana (IAST: Annaprāśana, Sanskrit: अन्नप्राशन) literally means "feeding of food", and the rite of passage marks the first time a baby eats solid food, typically containing cooked rice. Most Gryhasutras recommend this ritual in the sixth month, or when the child shows the first teeth, with slow weaning of the baby from breast feeding to other sources of food. Some texts recommend continued breast feeding of the child, as the child adapts to the various foods. The ritual is usually celebrated with cooked rice, in a paste of honey, ghee and curd. Sankhyayana Gryhasutra recommends that fish, goat or partridge meat gravy be added to the solid food that baby tastes for the first time, while Manava Gryhasutra is silent about the use of meat. The mother eats with the baby, the same food. The father sits with them and participates in the rite of passage. The rite of passage, in some texts, include charity and feeding of the poor, and ceremonial prayers by both parents.

==== Baby's first haircut, Chudakarana ====
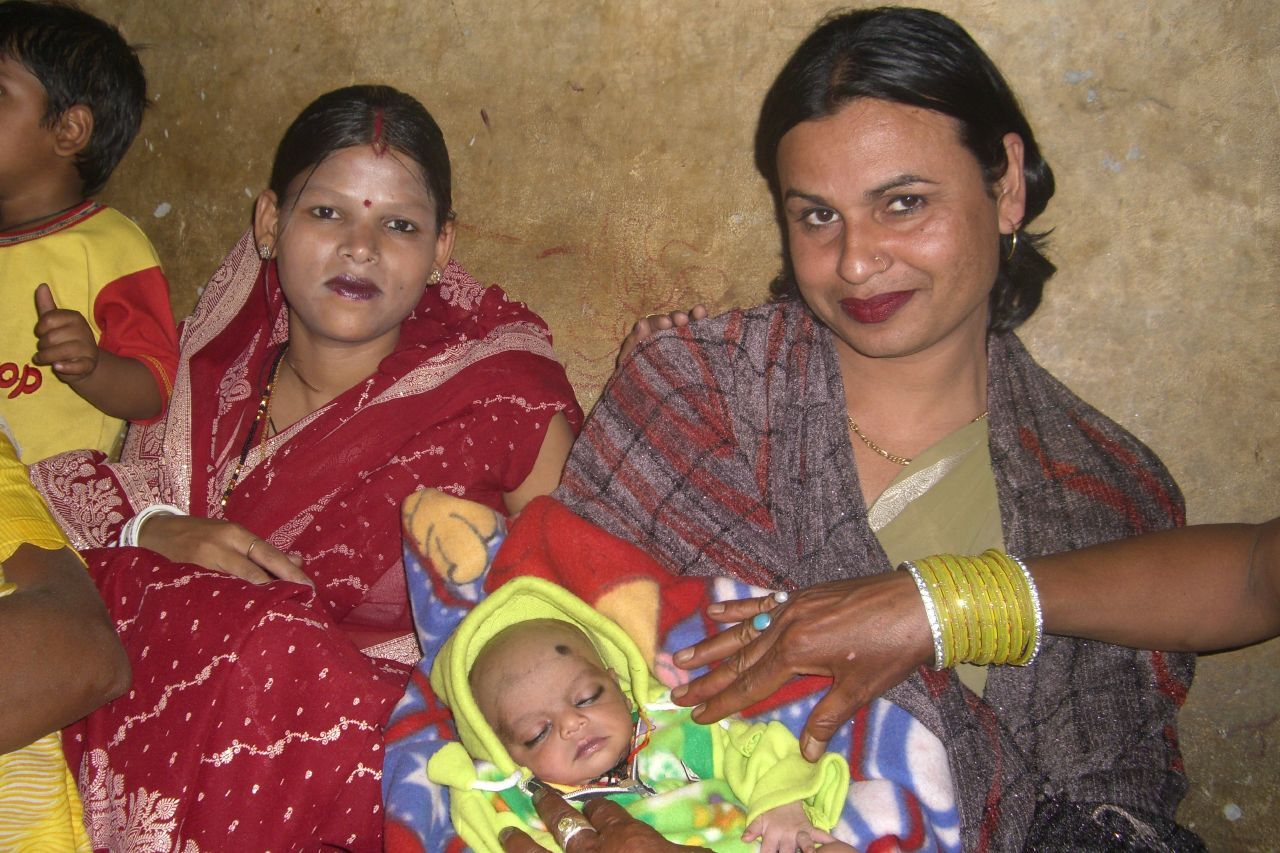
A baby's first haircut is called choulam samskara.

Chudakarana (IAST: Cūḍākaraṇa, Sanskrit: चूड़ाकरण) (literally, rite of tonsure), also known as choulam, caula, chudakarma, mundana or "mundan sanskar" is the rite of passage that marks the child's first haircut, typically the shaving of the head. The mother dresses up, sometimes in her wedding sari, and with the father present, the baby's hair is cut and the nails are trimmed. Sometimes, a tuft of hair is left to cover the soft spot near the top of baby's head.

The significance of this rite of passage is the baby's cyclical step to hygiene and cleanliness. The ritual is seen as a passage of purity. It is typically done about the first birthday, but some texts recommend that it be completed before the third or the seventh year. Sometimes, this ritual is combined with the rite of passage of Upanayana, initiation to formal schooling. The ritual may include recitation of prayers for the child's long life and happiness.

==== Baby's earlobe piercing rite, Karnavedha ====
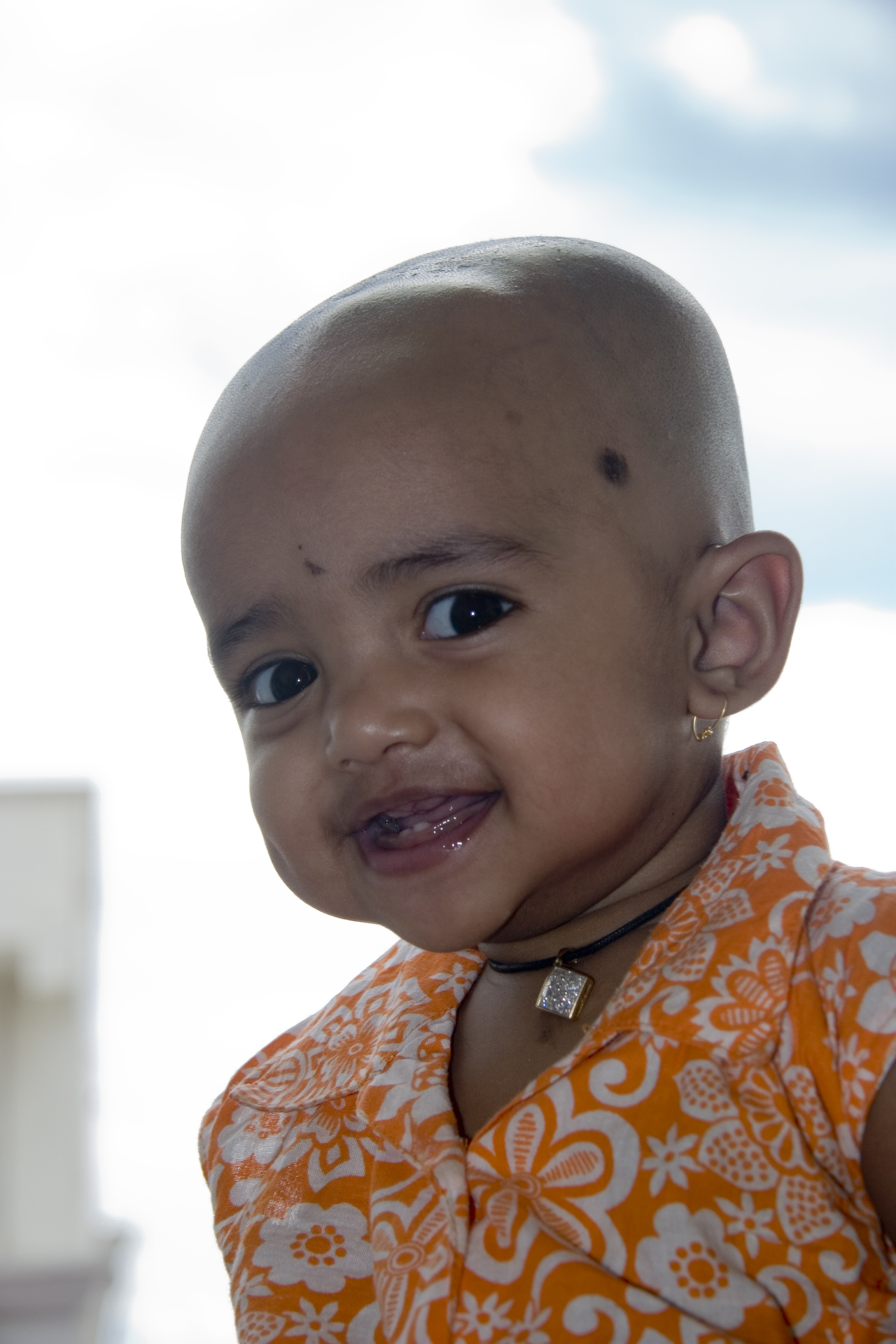
A Hindu girl after her Karnavedha rite of passage (ear piercing)

Karnavedha (IAST: Karṇavedha, Sanskrit: कर्णवेध) literally means "ear-piercing". This is a minor rite of passage that is not mentioned in most Gryha-sutras. Those that mention it state different schedules, with some suggesting the ritual within the first four weeks after birth, others suggesting within the first year. The purpose of this optional ritual is primarily an ornamentation of the body, and it is part of the baby's socialization process and culture emersion. The piercing is usually done with a clean gold thread, or silver needle.

For a baby boy, the right earlobe is pierced first. For a baby girl, the left earlobe is. In case of girls, the left nostril may also be pierced during this ritual. The piercing of the earlobes symbolically reminds the child, as he or she grows up, of beauty and social presence, of the importance of hearing and speech in the wisdom of the Vedas.

==== Child's commencement to knowledge, Vidyarambha ====
Vidyarambha (IAST: Vidyāraṃba, Sanskrit: विद्यारम्भ) literally means "beginning of study". It is also known as Akshararambha, Aksharaabhyaasa, or Aksharasvikara. It is a ritual that celebrates as a milestone, the child's formal attempt to learn means of knowledge. This includes steps where the child, helped by the parents and other family members, does one or more of the following: writes letters of the mother-tongue, draws mathematical numbers or shapes, and plays a musical instrument.

The oldest texts that describe rites of passage, such as the Dharmasutras, make no mention of Vidyarambha and go direct to Upanayana ritual at the eighth year. The later texts, such as the Samsakara Prakasha, from the first centuries of 1st millennium CE, mention Vidyarambha as a rite of passage in the fifth year of a child's life, suggesting that the process of learning started shifting to an earlier age of a child with time. The ceremony is observed on the same day for all children in their fifth year, on the day of Vijayadasami which is on the tenth of the Hindu month Ashvin (September–October). It includes a prayer to goddess Saraswati and deity Ganesh, a teacher is invited or the parents themselves work with the child to write Lipi (letters of the alphabet), draw Samkhya (numbers) or pictures, and sometimes play with an instrument. In modern times, parents mark this rite of passage in the third year of the child.

==== Child's entrance into school, Upanayana ====
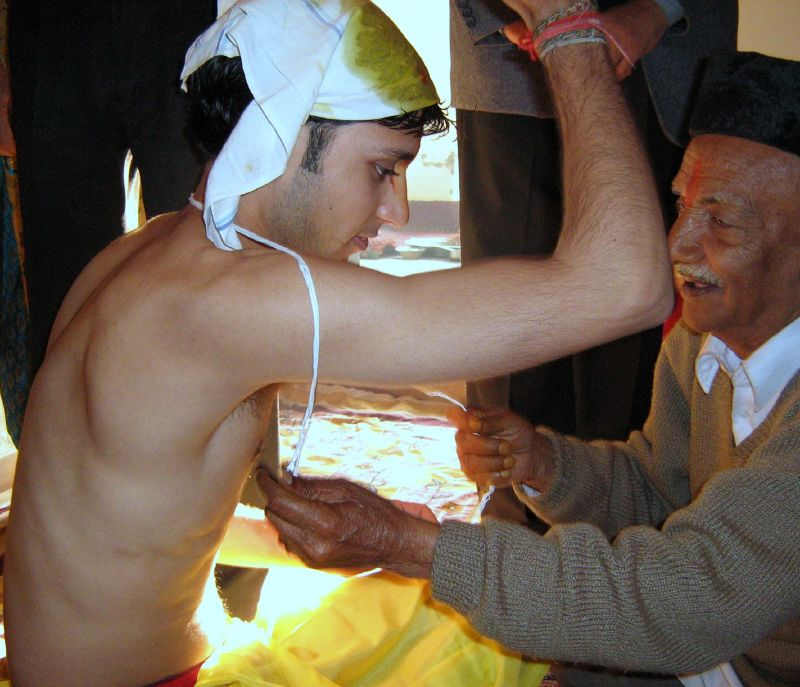
Upanayana samskara ceremony in progress. Typically, this ritual was for eight-year-olds in ancient India, but in the 1st millennium CE it became open to all ages.

Upanayana (IAST:Upanayana, Sanskrit: उपनयन) literally means "the act of leading to or near". It is an important and widely discussed samskara in ancient Sanskrit text. The rite of passage symbolizes the leading or drawing towards the self of a child, in a school, by a teacher. It is a ceremony in which a Guru (teacher) accepts and draws a child towards knowledge and initiates the second birth that is of the young mind and spirit.

Upanayana was an elaborate ceremony, that included rituals involving the family, the child and the teacher. During this ceremony, a boy receives a sacred thread called Yajñopaveetam, that he wears. Yajñopavita ceremony announced that the child had entered into formal education. In the modern era, the Upanayana rite of passage is open to anyone at any age.

Rajbali Pandey compares the Upanayana rite of passage to Baptism in Christianity where the person is born again unto spiritual knowledge, in addition to it being the ancient Indian rite of passage for the start of formal education of writing, numbers, reading, Vedangas, arts and other skills. The Upanayana rite of passage was also important to the teacher, as the student would therefrom begin to live in the Gurukul (school). Many medieval era texts discuss Upanayana in the context of three Varnas – Brahmins, Kshtreyas and Vaishyas. Several texts such as Sushruta Sutrasthana, however, also include Sudras entering schools and the formal education process, stating that the Upanayana samskara was open to everyone. The upanayana ceremony extended to women, in ancient Sanskrit texts, and the girls who underwent this rite of passage then pursued studies were called Brahmavadini. Those who did not performed upanayana ceremony at the time of their wedding. Instead of sacred thread, girls would wear their robe (now called sari or saree) in the manner of the sacred thread, that is over her left shoulder during this rite of passage.

The education of a student was not limited to ritual and philosophical speculations found in the Vedas and the Upanishads. They extended to many arts and crafts, which had their own but similar rites of passages. Aitareya Brahmana, Agamas and Puranas literature of Hinduism describe these as Shilpa Sastras, and they extend to all practical aspects of culture, such as the sculptor, the potter, the perfumer, the wheelwright, the painter, the weaver, the architect, the dancer, and the musician. Ancient Indian texts assert that the number of the arts is unlimited, but each deploy elements of 64 kala (कला, techniques) and 32 vidyas (विद्या, fields of knowledge). The training of these began from childhood, and included studies about dharma, culture, reading, writing, mathematics, geometry, colors, tools, as well as traditions (trade secrets). The rites of passage during apprentice education varied in the respective guilds.

==== Vedarambha ====
Praishartha (or Vedarambha) is the rite of passage that marked the start of learning the Vedas and Upanishads in Gurukulam or Pathashala (school). It was a fire ritual (yajna), where the teacher and the student sat together, with the teacher reciting initiation hymns and the student following. This ritual is missing in older texts, and Pandey suggests that the later tradition recognized the difference between getting accepted in a school, and the actual start of Veda studies when the student is ready to learn those texts. In ancient India, the student's preparation involved helping with school chores, living a simple life, going to villages and towns to seek donations of food (Bhiksha), collect and bring water, collect fuel sticks for cooking, general maintenance of the school and share the food he and others collect with his teacher and the student community. These were on-going rituals of living at living, and not considered as a distinct rite of passage. Prior to the initiation of the Veda study, the student learnt the vocabulary, grammar and other basic studies. The emphasis of the stage where the student started Veda study was both the memorization and know the meaning of each hymn, verse or mantra. Vedarambha marked the actual start of the Veda study.

Some texts describes two rituals each academic period (school year), one marking the start of Vedic studies each year, called Upakarma or Upakarana. The other ceremony was held at the end of each academic period, called Utasarjanam or Utsarga or Samapana, and marked the suspension of the Veda studies for a certain period of the year. The start of school ceremony, the Upakarma was observed in the month of Sravana (August) every year. It was held in the morning, and attended by the students, the teacher, people in the Grihastha stage (householders, parents) and Vanaprastha stage of life (retired, grandparents). The Utsarga, closing the study year, was held in the month of Magha (about February).

==== Keshanta and Ritusuddhi ====
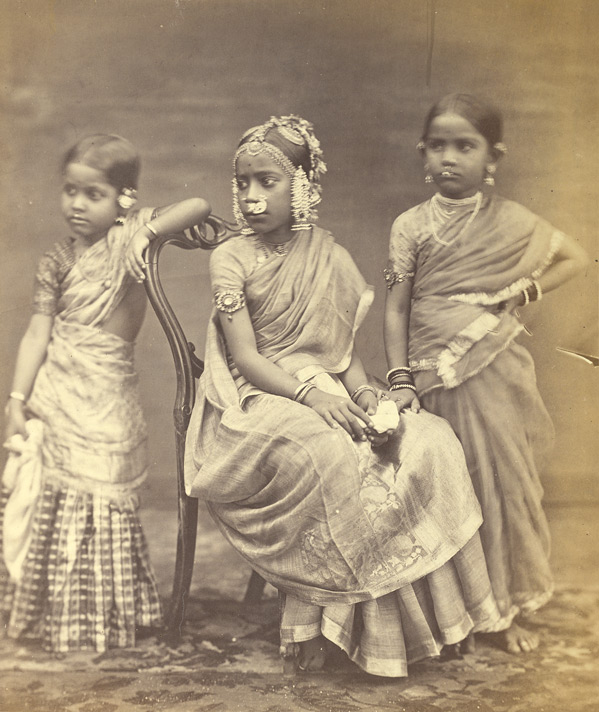
A Tamil Hindu girl (center) in 1870 wearing a half-saree, flowers and jewelry from her Ritu Kala samskara rite of passage

Keshanta (IAST: Keśānta) (literally, getting rid of hairs) is the first shave of a youth's facial hair. This was typically observed about age sixteen, and the emerging beard and moustache were shaved. The ceremony included gift giving such as to the barber and the teacher at his school. The coming of age ceremony ended with the student reciting his vow of chastity and the code of Brahmacharya.

Ritusuddhi, also called as Ritu Kala Samskara, is the corresponding coming of age ceremony for girls, after menarche or first menstruation. This milestone in a girl's life is observed by her family and friends, with gifts and her wearing a sari for the ritual. The rite of passage is celebrated, in modern times, as a "half-saree party" where the female relatives and friends of the girl gather, and she receives and wears a half-saree and other gifts. Thereafter, at ceremonious events, she wears the half-sarees, until her marriage when she puts on a full Sari.

==== Graduation ceremony, Samavartana ====
Samavartana (IAST: Samāvartana), or Snana, is the ceremony associated with the end of formal education and the Brahmacharya asrama of life. This rite of passage includes a ceremonial bath. This ceremony marked the end of school, but did not imply immediate start of married life. Typically, significant time elapsed between exiting the Brahmacharya stage of life and the entering of Grihastha stage of life.

Anyone who had complete this rite of passage was considered a Vidyasnataka (literally, bathed in knowledge, or showered with learning), and symbolized as one who had crossed the ocean of learning. This ceremony was a gathering of students and teacher. The student asked the teacher for any gift (guru-dakshina) he desired, which if specified was the student's responsibility to deliver over his lifetime. Then, after a recitation of a graduate's dharma (snataka-dharma) and a fire ritual, the graduate took a bath. The ceremony occurred after completion of at least 12 years of school, that is either about age 21 or later.

Taittiriya Upanishad describes, in the eleventh anuvaka of Shiksha Valli, the snataka-dharma recitation emphasized by the teacher to a graduate at this rite of passage. The verses ask the graduate to take care of themselves and pursue Dharma, Artha and Kama to the best of their abilities. Parts of the verses in section 1.11.1, for example, state

Never err from Truth,
Never err from Dharma,
Never neglect your well-being,
Never neglect your health,
Never neglect your prosperity,
Never neglect Svādhyāya (study of oneself) and Pravacana (exposition of Vedas).

— Taittirĩya Upanishad, I.11.1

The eleventh anuvaka of Shiksha Valli list behavioral guidelines for the graduating students from a gurukul,

Be one to whom a mother is as god, be one to whom a father is as god,
Be one to whom an Acharya (spiritual guide, scholars you learn from) is as god,
Be one to whom a guest is as god.
Let your actions be uncensurable, none else.
Those acts that you consider good when done to you, do those to others, none else.

— Taittirĩya Upanishad, I.11.2

The third section of the eleventh anuvaka lists charity and giving, with faith, sympathy, modesty and cheerfulness, as ethical precept for the graduating students at the Samavartana rite of passage.

==== Vivaha ====
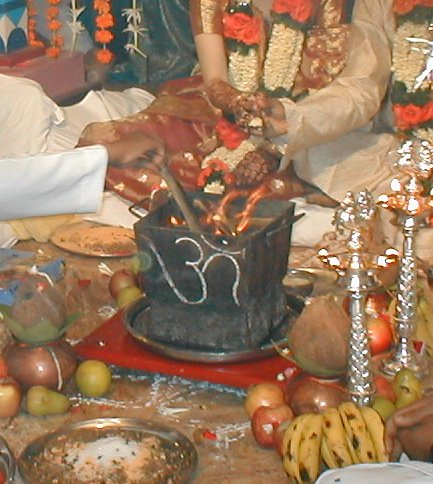
A rite of passage with yajna ceremony often marks a Hindu wedding.

Vivaha (IAST: Vivāha, Sanskrit: विवाह) is the rite of passage and rituals associated with marriage. While there are many rituals in Hinduism, vivaha (wedding) is the most extensive personal ritual an adult Hindu undertakes in his or her life.

The wedding rites and ceremonies begin with the engagement of a couple, and extend to rites of passage after the completion of wedding. They are typically very colorful, and celebrations may extend for several days. The detailed rituals and process in a Hindu wedding vary. Nevertheless, there are a few key rituals common in Hindu weddings - Kanyadana, Panigrahana, and Saptapadi, which are respectively, giving away of daughter by the father, voluntarily holding hand near the fire to signify union, and taking seven steps with each step includes a vow/promise to each other before fire. The Vivaha samskara is essentially a Vedic yajna ritual, with recitation of Vedic hymns. The primary witness of a Hindu marriage is the Vedic fire-deity Agni, in the presence of family and friends.

Post-wedding rites of passage include Grihapravesha – the welcoming of the bride to her new home by groom's mother, father, brother(s), or sister(s), and other relatives. Chaturthikarma – literally, "the rite performed on the fourth day after wedding", is the rite where the first domestic fire is lit marking the food-related householder life of the new couple.

The act of first sexual intercourse after the wedding, is known as nishekam.

==== Vratas ====
Vrata literally means a vow or practice, any pious observance, act of devotion or austerity such as fasting. These were cyclical rites of passage of those in Grihastha (householder) stage of life, typically as reminder of some pious action, reflective, spiritual side of life. Most Gryhasutras and several Smritis include four Veda-vratas as samskara after graduation, as means of continuing self-education. The four Vratas includes Sukriya (study Rigveda), Sakvara, Vratika and Upanishad Vrata. The rite of passage ceremony for each of these marked the start of the self study by the householder, which lasted between 1, 3, 6 or 9 years each.

=== Cremation ritual, Antyeshti ===
Antyesti (IAST: Antayeṣṭi, Sanskrit: अन्त्येष्टि) (literally, last rites or last sacrifice), sometimes referred to as Antima Samskaram, Antya-kriya, Anvarohanyya, or Vahni samskara, are the rituals associated with funeral. This samskara is not mentioned in the lists of samskaras in most of the grhyasutras and other texts that discuss samskaras. The details and procedures of this rite are given in separate texts, dealing only with this topic.

A dead adult Hindu is mourned with a cremation, while a dead child is typically buried. The rite of passage is performed in harmony with the sacred premise that the microcosm of all living beings is a reflection of a macrocosm of the universe. The soul (Atman, Brahman) is the essence and immortal that is released at the Antyeshti ritual, but both the body and the universe are vehicles and transitory in various schools of Hinduism. They consist of five elements: air, water, fire, earth and space. The last rite of passage returns the body to the five elements and origins. The roots of this belief are found in the Vedas, for example in the hymns of Rigveda in section 10.16, as follows,

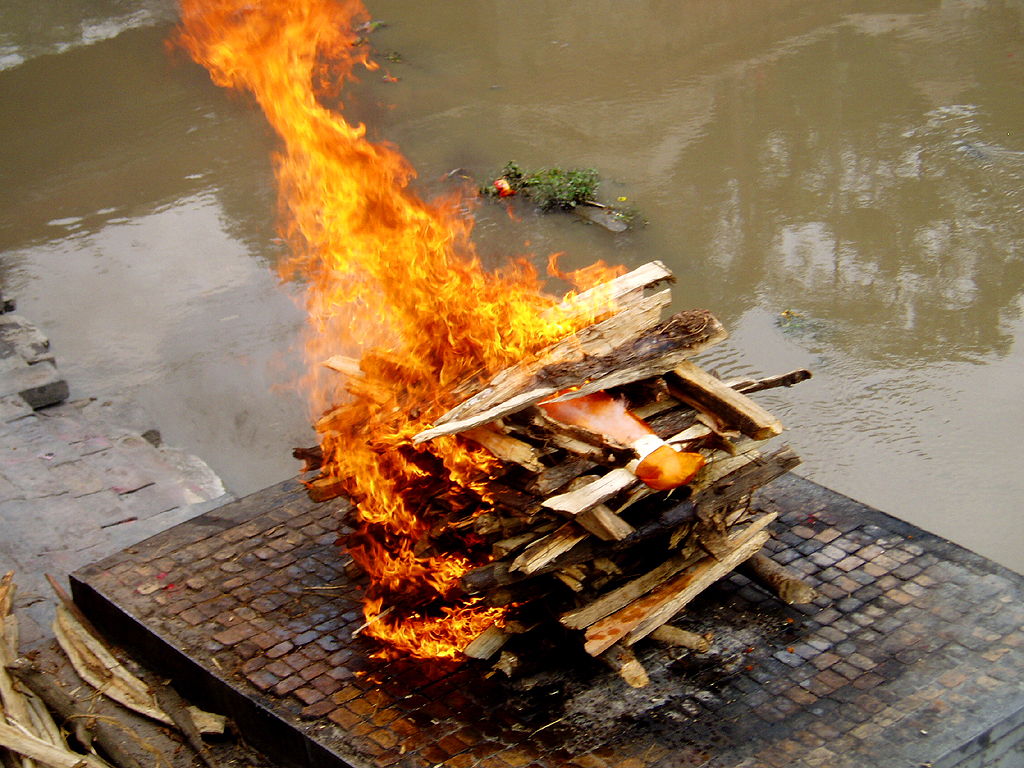
A Hindu cremation rite in Nepal. The samskara above shows the body wrapped in saffron on a pyre.

Burn him not up, nor quite consume him, Agni: let not his body or his skin be scattered,
O all possessing Fire, when thou hast matured him, then send him on his way unto the Fathers.
When thou hast made him ready, all possessing Fire, then do thou give him over to the Fathers,
When he attains unto the life that waits him, he shall become subject to the will of gods.
The Sun receive thine eye, the Wind thy Prana (life-principle, breathe); go, as thy merit is, to earth or heaven.
Go, if it be thy lot, unto the waters; go, make thine home in plants with all thy members.

— Rigveda 10.16

The final rites of a burial, in case of untimely death of a child, is rooted in Rig Veda's section 10.18, where the hymns mourn the death of the child, praying to deity Mrityu to "neither harm our girls nor our boys", and pleads the earth to cover, protect the deceased child as a soft wool.

The last rites are usually completed within a day of death. The body is washed, wrapped in white cloth if the dead is a man or a widow (red if her husband is still alive), the two toes tied together with a string, a Tilak (red mark) placed on the forehead. The dead adult's body is carried to the cremation ground near a river or water, by family and friends, and placed on a pyre with feet facing south. The eldest son, or a male mourner, or a priest then bathes before leading the cremation ceremonial function. He circumambulates the dry wood pyre with the body, says a eulogy or recites a hymn in some cases, places sesame seed in the dead person's mouth, sprinkles the body and the pyre with ghee (clarified butter), then draws three lines signifying Yama (deity of the dead), Kala (time, deity of cremation) and the dead. The pyre is then set ablaze, while the mourners mourn. The ash from the cremation is consecrated to the nearest river or sea. After the cremation, in some regions, the immediate male relatives of the deceased shave their head and invite all friends and relatives, on the tenth or twelfth day, to eat a simple meal together in remembrance of the deceased. This day, in some communities, also marks a day when the poor and needy are offered food in memory of the dead.

== Samskara in Jainism ==
Similar to Hinduism, samskara serve as a rite of passage into a new phase of life in different sects of Jainism.

In the Digambara school, all 16 Hindu samskaras (see above) were incorporated by Jinasena in the Adipurana as part of 53 kriyas, of which 23 rites of passage are described for the Jain householder, with the last culminating in renunciation of household life. For those who skip the householder stage of life, the equivalent rite of passage was the 11th pratima, and called diksha (initiation into mendicancy).

In the Śvētāmbara school, 16 samskaras similar to the Hindu rites of passage are described, for example, in the Acara-Dinakara of Vardhamana. It includes rituals described above, such as those associated with conception, birth, name giving, ear piercing, baby's first haircut, studentship, wedding and death.

There are some differences between symbolism associated with samskara rites in Hinduism and Jainism. The fire ceremony has Vedic significance in the former, while it symbolizes the Tirthankaras, Ganadharas and Kevalins in Jainism. The mantras are often derived from Vedic texts in Hinduism, while they are derived from Jain texts such as Ratnatraya in Jainism. The oaths in some rites of passage include the vow of ahimsa (non-violence, non injury to all human beings and living beings) in both, but is of exclusive significance in Jainism.

== Sanskars in Sikhism ==
Although Sikhs may individually recognise many rites of passage, four are universally important in Sikh religious life. They are the four main sanskars:

1. Naam Karan, "Naming a Child" ― the rite of naming a newborn at the Gurdwara; traditionally, it is during this rite that male Sikhs take the middle name Singh and female Sikhs take the middle name Kaur alongside their given first name.
2. Amrit Sanskar (also called Amrit Sanchar), "Ambrosia Rite" ― the Sikh rite of initiation (sometimes described as the 'Sikh baptism'); converts to Sikhism may take the traditional middle name of Singh or Kaur after receiving amrit although this is not a requirement.
3. Anand Karaj, "Blissful Union" ― the Sikh rite of marriage.
4. Antam Sanskar, "Final Rite" ― the Sikh funeral rites; traditionally, Sikhs are cremated during the funeral ceremony and the ashes are collected and immersed in a body of water.

Other rites of passage such as Dastar Bandhi, the first tying of the Dastar (the traditional Sikh turban), may also be celebrated.

== Samskara as a philosophical concept ==
In the context of karma theory, Samskara are dispositions, character or behavioral traits either as default from birth (previous lives in some schools of Hinduism), or Samskara are behavioral traits perfected over time through Yoga, through conscious shaping of inner self, one's desire, sense of moral responsibility and through practice. In some schools of Hinduism, the psychological concept of samskara is also known as vāsanā.

These are viewed as traces or temperament that evolves through the refinement of an individual inner consciousness and expressed personality, and is a form of "being-preparedness" in Vedantic psychology. In Samkhya and Yoga schools, samskara – also spelled as Samksara – are impressions or residues that affect an individual's Gunas (behavior attributes). In Nyaya school of Hinduism, not all Samskara are psychological. In these schools of Hinduism, rites of passage, other actions, studies, diligent preparation and inner resolutions trigger impressions or dispositions in the psyche of an individual. These influences determine how the individual acts, perceives themselves, and responds to or accepts karmic circumstances and the future.

== See also ==
- Hindu genealogy registers at Haridwar
- Dharmasutras
- Kalpa (Vedanga)
- Vedas
- Dharma
- Kama
- Artha
