= Nāmakaraṇa =

Hindu rite of passage of a naming ceremony

Namakarana (Sanskrit: नामकरणम्, romanized: Nāmakaraṇam, lit. 'name-giving') is the naming ceremony in Hinduism and a samskara (rite of passage) to name a baby.

== Description ==
According to the Grhya Sutras, Namakarana ceremony is typically performed on the tenth or the twelfth day after birth. Some texts suggest the naming ceremony be done on the first new moon or full moon day after the 10th day of birth. Alternate opinions range from the tenth day to the first day of the second year.

On the day of this samskara, the infant is bathed and dressed in new garments. Their formal name, selected by the parents, is announced. The naming ritual solemnizes the child as an individual, marking the process by which a child is accepted and socialized by people around them. The rite of passage also includes a gathering of friends and relatives of the baby's parents, typically with gifts and for a feast.

The ancient Sanskrit texts provide numerous and divergent guidelines to the parents for choosing names. A boy's name by ancient conventions is typically of two or four syllables, starting with a sonant, a semivowel in the middle, and ending in a visarga. A girl's name is typically an odd number of syllables, ending in a long ā or ī, resonant and easy to pronounce. Unpleasant, inauspicious, or words that easily transform into bad or evil words must be avoided, state the Gryhasutras, while the preferred names are those affiliated with a deity, virtues, good qualities, lucky stars, constellation, derivatives of the name of the father, or mother, or the place of birth, or beautiful elements of nature (trees, flowers, birds).

Five names can be given to the new born as per rashi, nakshatra, masa, family deity, and worldly name.

== See also ==
- Barasala
- Twelve Auspicious Rites
- Naam Karan

== Sources ==
- Asoke Kumar Majumdar (1983). Concise History of Ancient India. Vol. 3. ISBN 978-81-215-0176-7.
