= Jatakarma =

Hindu rite of passage celebrating the birth of a child

Jatakarman (Sanskrit: जातकर्मन्; IAST: Jātakarman; lit. 'natal rites') is one of the major samskaras in Hinduism, that celebrates the birth of a child. It is typically a private rite of passage that is observed by the new parents, relatives of the baby and close friends.

== Etymology ==
Jatakarman is a composite Sanskrit word, with roots Jāta and karman. The word Jata (जात) literally means "born, brought into existence, engendered, arisen, caused, appeared". The word karman (कर्मन्) literally means "action, performance, duty, obligation, any religious activity or rite, attainment". The composite word, Jatakarman, thus means "a rite when one is born" or "a birth ceremony".

The root of the rite of passage is related to Jatak, which is the ancient Sanskrit word for a "new born infant".

== Description ==
Jatakarman is the first post-natal rite of passage for a new born baby, in ancient texts of Hinduism. It celebrates the baby's birth, as well as the bonding of the father with the baby. During a traditional Jātakarman ritual, the father welcomes the baby by touching the baby's lips with honey and ghee (clarified butter). Sometimes, this ritual is marked with the recitation of Vedic hymns. The first significance of the hymns is explained in Gryhasutra texts to be medhajanana (Sanskrit: मेधाजनन), or to initiate the baby's mind and intellect in the womb of the world after the baby's body formation has completed in the womb of the mother. The second part of the hymns wish the baby a long life.

== Literature ==
The Brihadaranyaka Upanishad, in the last chapter detailing lessons for Grihastha stage of life for a student, describes this rite of passage, in verses 6.4.24 to 6.4.27, as follows,

When a child is born, he prepares the fire, places the child on his lap, and having poured Prishadajya of Dahi (yoghurt) and Ghrita (clarified butter), into a metal jug, he sacrifices the mix into the fire, saying:
"May I, as I prosper in this my house, nourish a thousand ! May fortune never fail in its race, with offspring and cattle, Svah !
I offer to thee [the baby] in my mind the vital breaths which are in me, Svah !
Whatever in my work I have done too much, or whatever I have done too little, may the wise Agni make it right, make it proper, Svah !"

— Brihadaranyaka Upanishad 6.4.24

The Upanishad includes the prayer to deity Saraswati during this rite of passage, the goddess of knowledge and wisdom in Hindu tradition. It also includes the threefold repetition of "Speech, Speech" with the assertion to the baby, "You are the Vedas! so, live a hundred autumns", into the baby's ear by the father. At the end of the ritual pronouncements by the father, he gives the baby to the mother's breast for feeding.

While the earliest Dharmasutras list Jatakarma and Namakarama as two different sanskara, they evolve into one in many Gryhasutra texts. By Pantanjali's time, these two rites of passage had merged into one, and completed within the first two weeks of the baby's birth, usually about the tenth day.
