= Shinbyu =

Burmese Theravada Buddhist novitiation ceremony

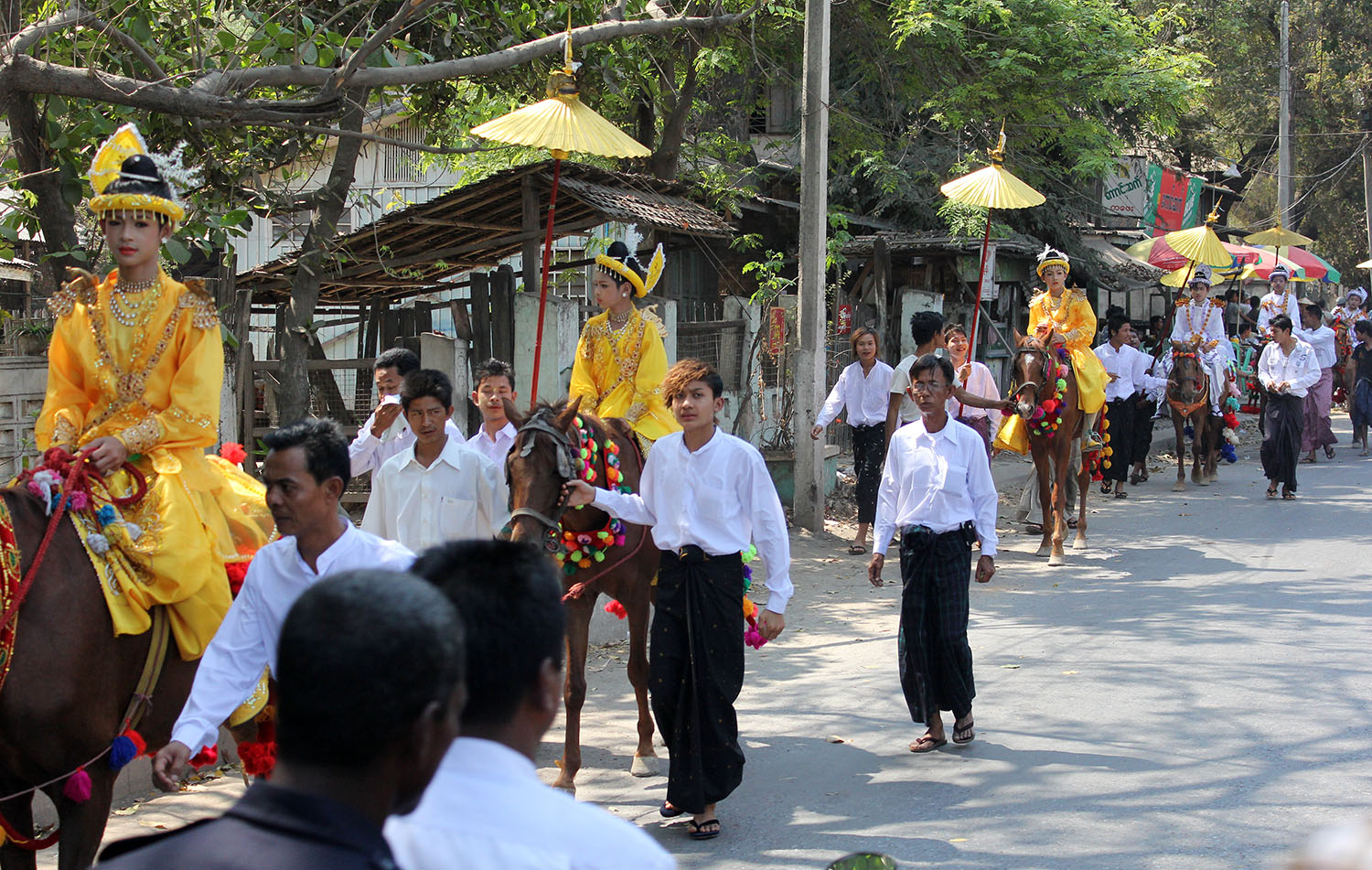
A shinbyu ceremony at Mandalay.

Shinbyu (Burmese: ရှင်ပြု; MLCTS: hrang pru.; pronounced [ʃɪ̀ɰ̃bjṵ], also spelt shinpyu) is the Burmese term for a novitiation ceremony (pabbajja) in the tradition of Theravada Buddhism, referring to the celebrations marking the sāmaṇera (novitiate) monastic ordination of a boy under the age of 20.

Shinbyu is considered one of the Twelve Auspicious Rites in Burmese culture. It is deemed the most important duty that parents owe to their son by letting him go forth and embrace the legacy of Gautama Buddha, join the sangha and become immersed in the teachings of the Buddha, the Dhamma, at least for a short while, perhaps longer if not for the rest of his life. A boy may become a novice on more than one occasion, but by the age of twenty there will be another great occasion, the upasampada ordination, in which the boy becomes a fully ordained bhikkhu (ပဉ္စင်း bazin). Those who are not blessed with a male child will seek for an orphan boy or a boy from very poor families in order to receive this special dispensation by the Buddha and hence gain great merit by the act. Shinbyu may well be regarded as a rite of passage or coming of age ceremony as in other religions. Allowing a son to spend some time however short it may be, in a kyaung (Burmese Buddhist monastery) is regarded by most Burmese Buddhists as the best religious gift that his parents can give him and it is believed to have a lasting effect on his life.

== History ==
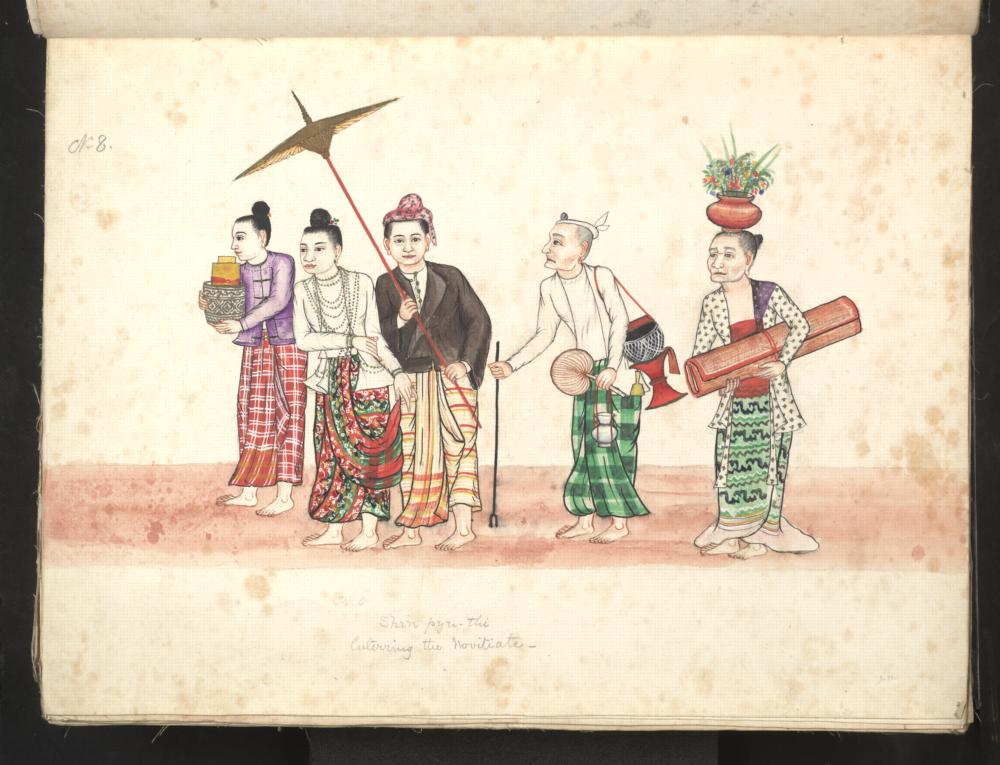
A 19th century watercolor depicting a shinbyu procession.

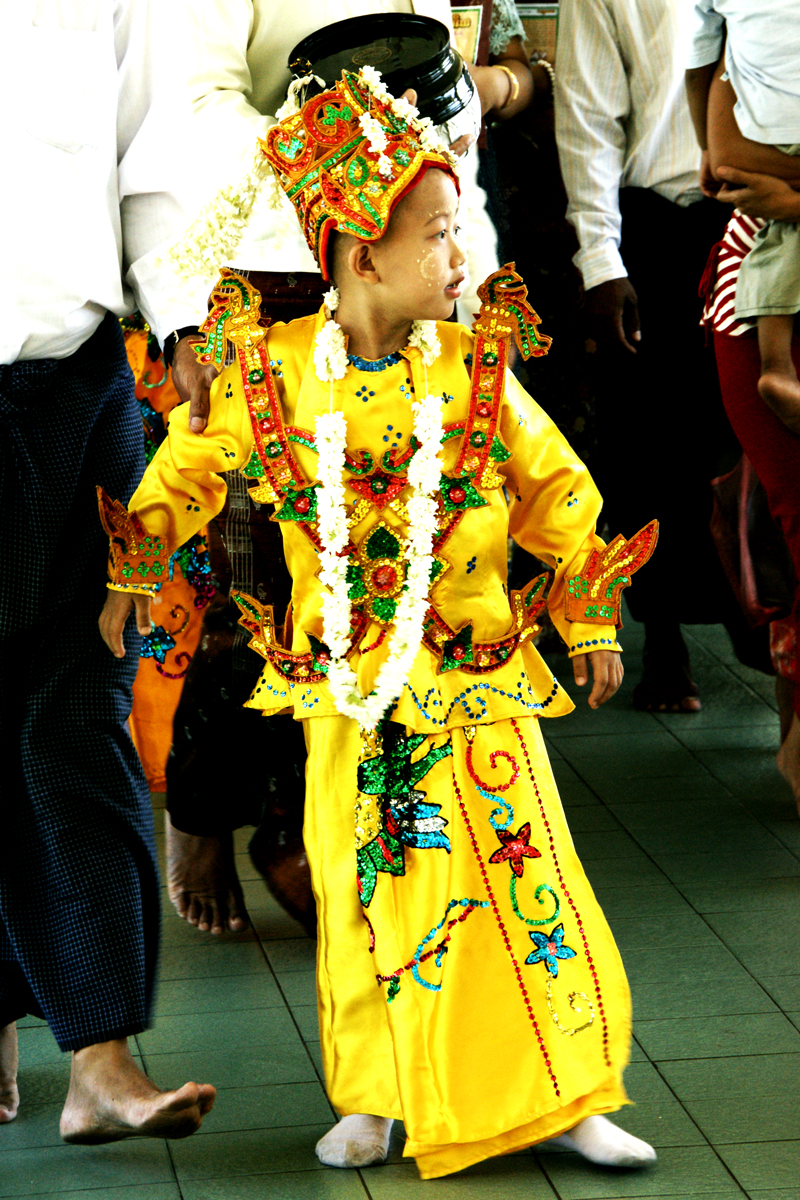
The royal outfit worn by novitiates-to-be before being samanera ordination, to re-enact Rahula's rejection of a princely life in exchange for a life of self-detachment.

The first shinbyu in history is believed to have taken place in the Buddha's lifetime two and a half millennia ago. It was his own son who approached the prodigal father, at his mother Yasodharā's bidding, to ask for his inheritance. "Very well", said the Buddha, "here then is my legacy for you", beckoning one of his disciples to shave the head of the young prince and adorn him with the robe of an ascetic in exchange for his princely dress, and Rahula was then bidden to follow the Buddha to his forest monastery.

== Prelude ==
The abbot (ဆရာတော် Sayadaw, lit. royal teacher) of the village monastery will choose an auspicious day for the novitiation; the New Year festival period, Thingyan or a-hka dwin (အခါတွင်း), is a favourite time of the year. There may be boys from an extended family or families from the same neighbourhood or village being prepared for it. This usually includes learning how to recite the request for robes called thingan daung (သင်္ကန်းတောင်း) and the Ten Precepts (ဆယ်ပါးသီလ seba thila) - they are already familiar with the basic Five Precepts (ငါးပါးသီလ ngaba thila) - as well as some monastic rules. Parents will chide them if they are caught climbing trees or swimming in the river for fear of accidents or catching a bad cold in the run-up to this great event. Their sisters and older members of the family will call at every house in the village with a lacquerware dish of pickled tea leaves called lahpet (လက်ဖက်) and invite entire households to the shinbyu a-hlu (ရှင်ပြုအလှူ). And acceptance is indicated by the partaking of the lahpet. Printed invitations however are more common in towns and cities today.

== Ceremony ==
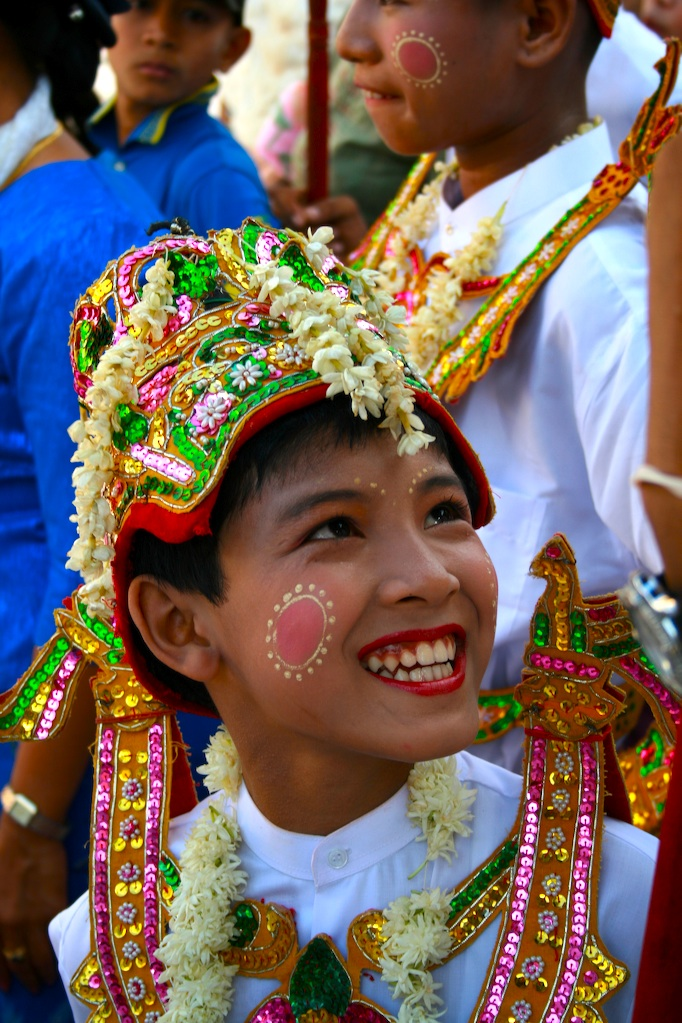
Novitiate-to-be dressed in traditional prince attire, including a salwe.

Festivals start on the eve of shinbyu called a-hlu win (အလှူဝင်) with a pwè (ပွဲ) an orchestra and dance/drama/comedy ensemble) and tea for the guests. In the middle of a street, a pandal or mandat (မဏ္ဍပ်) constructed from bamboo and papier-mâché with ornately painted gold and silver columns, pediments and finials has sprung up overnight. Sweets such as jaggery or cane sugar bars and a-hlu lahpet (အလှူလက်ဖက်), pickled tea laced with sesame oil encircled by small heaps of fried peas, peanuts and garlic, toasted sesame, crushed dried shrimps and shredded preserved ginger) are served with green tea. In towns and cities, assorted cakes, ice cream and coffee have superseded the traditional sweets but lahpet still holds centre stage.

The big day starts early with a procession called the shinlaung hlè pwe (ရှင်လောင်းလှည့်ပွဲ) to the monastery, the young boy dressed in resplendent silks embroidered with gold as a royal prince or king, shielded from the sun by a gold umbrella and led on horseback by an orchestral band headed by a clown with a moustache called U Shwe Yoe holding a parasol and dancing merrily. This ritual symbolises Prince Siddhartha's departure from the royal palace with its sensuous pleasures and luxuries at the age of twenty nine, leaving his wife and newborn son in search of the Four Noble Truths. Behind his horse follows the family, his proud parents carrying the monastic robes and other eight requisites, called pareihkara shippa (ပရိက္ခရာရှစ်ပါး) and his sisters or young village maidens carrying ceremonial boxes of paan (ကွမ်းတောင်ကိုင် kundaung gaing) and lotus blossoms (ပန်းတောင်ကိုင် pandaung gaing) all in their best silks with the rest of the joyous party completing the procession. The Shwedagon Pagoda is invariably a shinbyu procession's first port of call in Yangon. The novice-to-be (ရှင်လောင်း shinlaung) may be the centre of attention, but his sister may at the same ceremony have an ear-piercing (နားထွင်း na htwin) with a gold needle, dressed up as a royal princess herself.

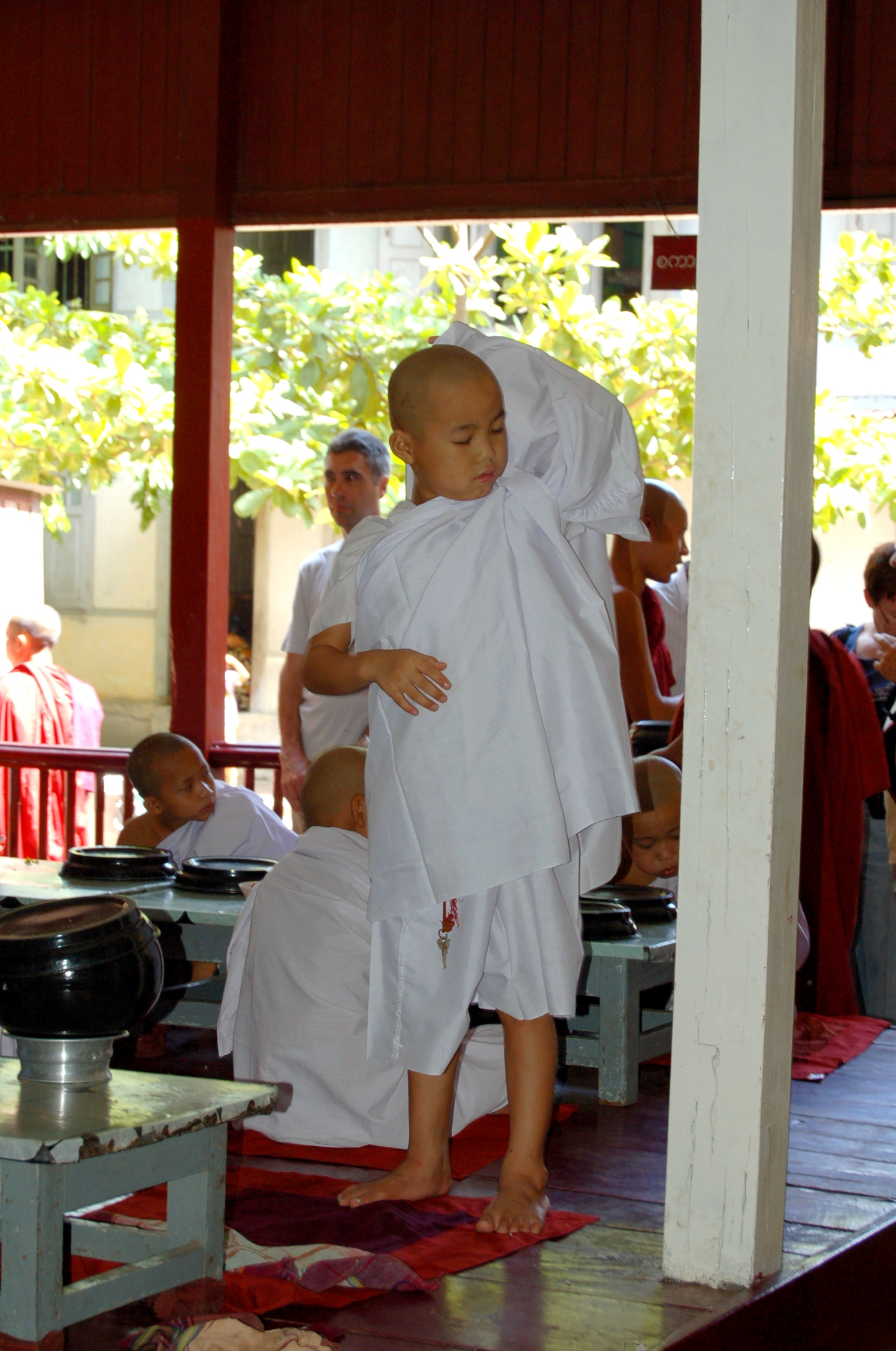
A boy donning white monastic robes before being ordained as a samanera (shin thamane)

At the monastery, the monks are assembled to preside over the ceremony and to receive their young charge as well as various alms and offerings. A feast has been prepared for all with low round tables set on fine bamboo mats and rugs or in a marquee with long bamboo tables and benches. It will have been declared a "smokeless day" (မီးခိုးတိတ် migo deik) for the village as no cooking fires will be lit and everyone including their dogs are welcome to the feast which includes meat and poultry dishes, soup or broth, curried salted fish with vegetables on the side, fermented green mango or bean sprouts followed by dessert, again with lahpet.

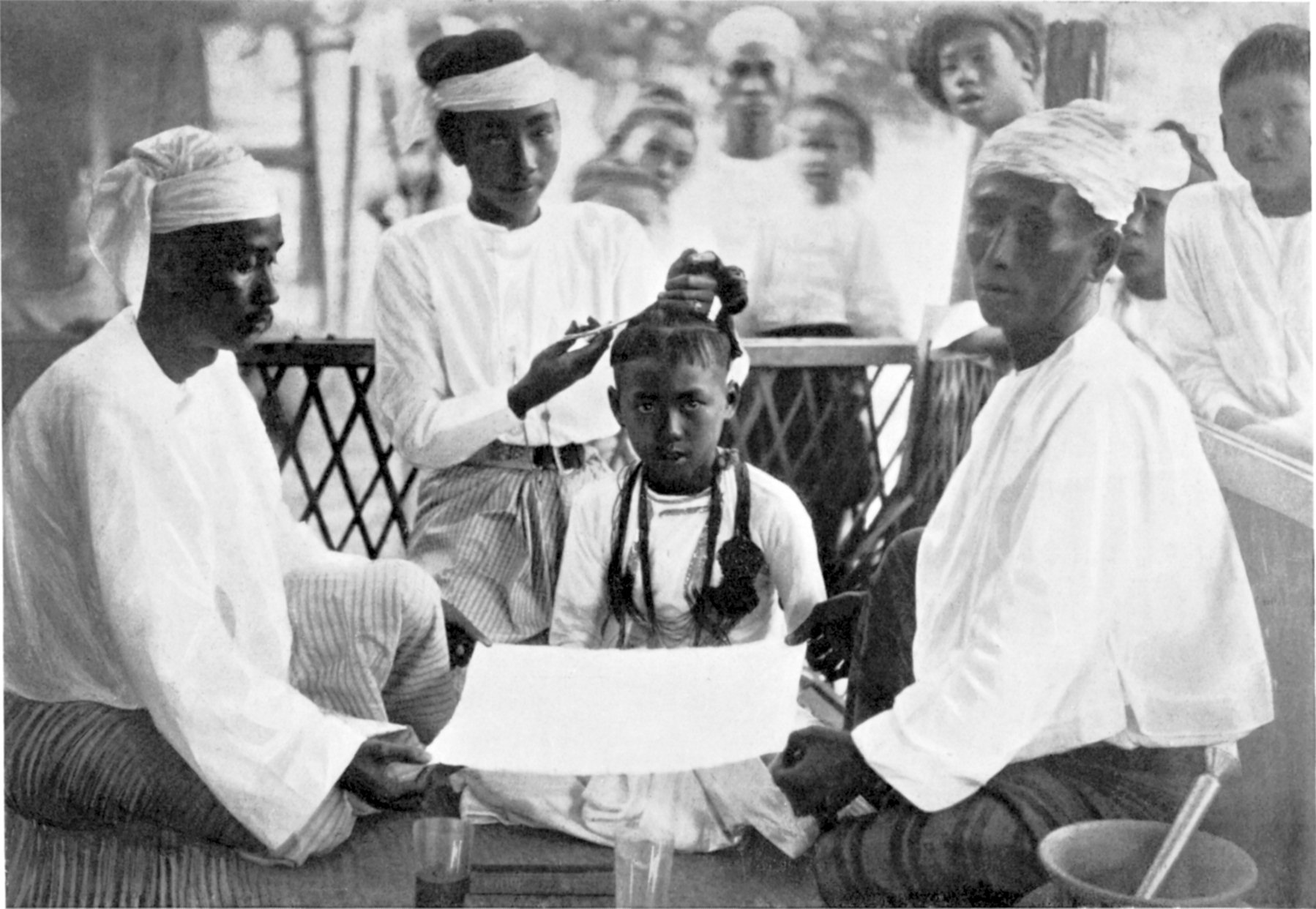
Hsan cha, shaving of the head.

A brahmin may be specially hired to act as master of ceremonies especially for a na htwin, but monks will supervise and perform the shaving of the head, called hsan cha (ဆံချ). The hair is received in a white cloth by the parents who kneel together with the young shinlaung (ရှင်လောင်း), while the boy recites reflects on bodily defilements in Pali, to increase self-detachment from his hair. The boy, now having exchanged his princely garb with white robes, kneels before the Sayadaw and recites the Ten Precepts, followed by the thingan daung (သင်္ကန်းတောင်း). He receives the saffron robe and is helped into this by a monk. Next, he is given his alms bowl (သပိတ် thabeik) and palm-leaf fan (ယပ် yat) from his parents with smiles of joy and tears of sorrow, his mother at the thought of parting with her dear son for the first time.

== New novice ==
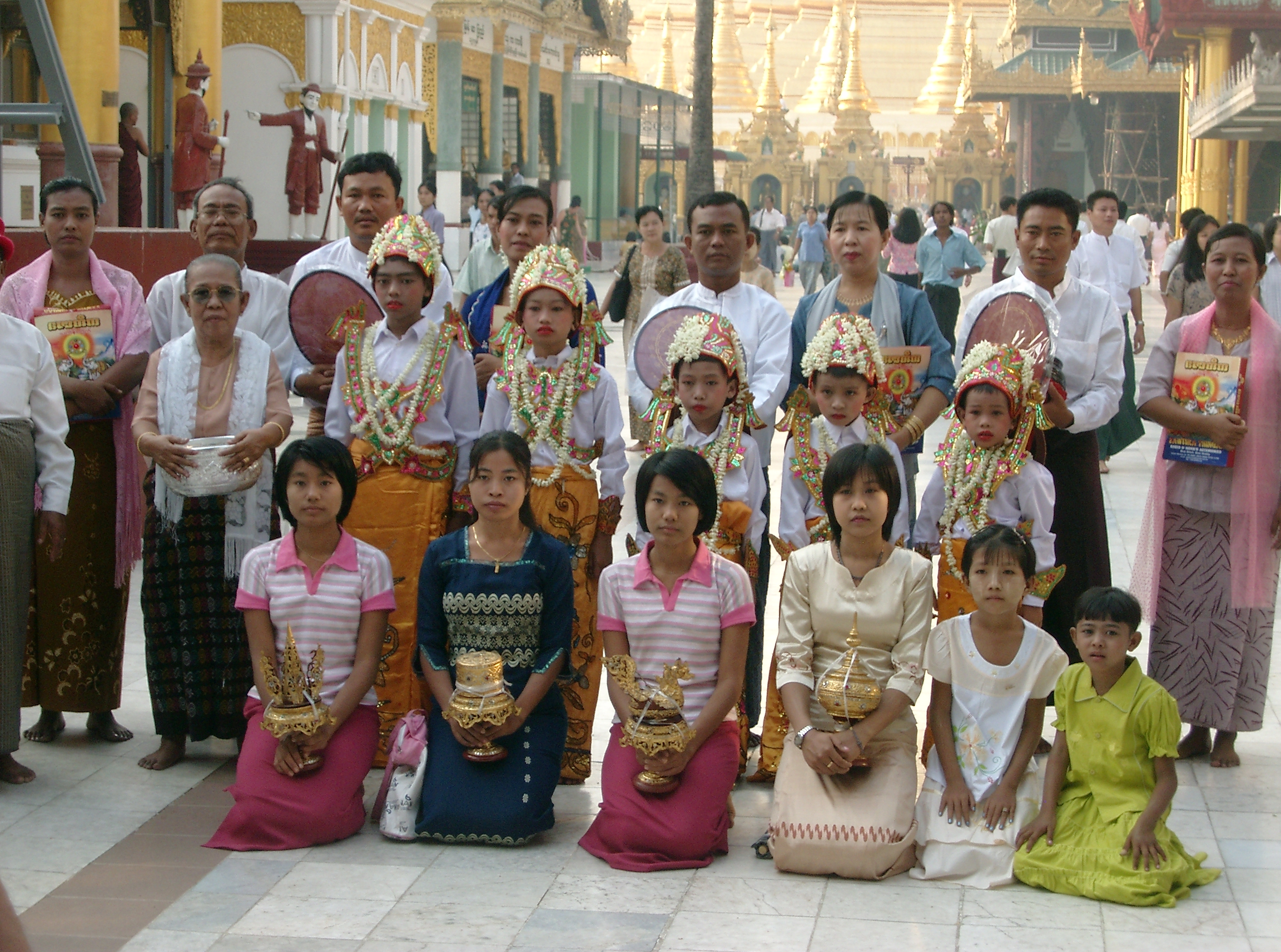
A shinbyu ceremony at Shwedagon Pagoda.

Even the mightiest of Buddhist kings in history would kneel before a young sāmaṇera because he wore the Buddha's mantle, so the parents pay obeisance (ရှိခိုး shihko) to their young son, now held on a higher echelon, as well as to the venerable monks. No physical display of affection can now be considered appropriate until he leaves the monastery. He gains a new Dhamma name (ဘွဲ့ bwe) in Pali, traditionally based on an astrology-based naming system, such as Shin Ponnya if Thursday-born or Shin Tayza for a Saturday-born. A special form of language for monks will be used by the layfolk when they talk to him. He will be addressed as koyin (ကိုရင်) by everyone including his parents and they in turn addressed by him as daga gyi (ဒကာကြီး) and dagama gyi (ဒကာမကြီး). Back in the village, celebrations can resume with the promise of a good pwè for the evening, another free show for the entire neighbourhood or village called aung bwè (a show to celebrate success).

== See also ==
- Pabbajjā
- Poy Sang Long
- Satuditha
- Upasampadā
