= Barasala =

Hindu naming ceremony

Barasala (also Namakarana Dolarohana or Naam Karan, or spelled Balasare) is a traditional ceremony of naming a newborn baby among Hindu communities of India.

== Process ==
The Barasala is usually celebrated on the 7th day, 11th day, 16th day, 21st day, 3rd month, 5th month or 29th month after the birth of a child. Brahmins determine an auspicious time for the ceremony, which is conducted either at a temple or at home. Prior to this function, the house is cleaned well to perform some pujas.

On the day, the baby is given a bath, clothed and placed in a cradle. Women gather around the cradle to sing traditional songs. In the ritual, the mother is honoured and the child is blessed by the elders of the family and community. The father whispers the baby's name into its ear three times. The name is also written on rice spread on the floor or on a tray. The child's maternal uncle takes a gold ring dipped in a mixture of cow milk & honey and puts it on the baby's tongue. The elders then give blessings to the child that it may earn a good reputation, become a great person, and have a bright future. Many communities combine this ceremony with cradle ceremony on 21st day after checking out auspicious time and date without Rahukalam and durmuhurtam.

The cradle is cleaned and turmeric and vermilion is applied and decorated it with flowers. Tambulam is placed in the four corners of the swing, and the baby is placed in the cradle by the elder member from the child's father's family, with or without the priest chanting mantras. The child is placed in and the elder swings the cradle three times followed by akshintalu and a blessing of the child. Blessings from the rest of the family follow.

The ceremony is performed at home or in a temple.

== Purpose ==
Although the child cannot understand the purpose, the ceremony helps the parents to realise that they have to shape their child into a good citizen and show a bright future to the child. It also helps the guests to realise the greatness and sweetness of human life.

== See also ==
- Nāmakaraṇa
