= Garbhadhana =

Hindu rite of passage marking intent to have a child

Garbhadhana (Sanskrit: गर्भाधान, Garbhādhāna) (literally: attaining the wealth of the womb) is the first of the 16 saṃskāras (sacraments, rites of passage) in Hinduism.

== Description ==
Garbhadhana is a composite word of Garbha (womb) and Ādhāna (process of receiving), and it literally means receiving pregnancy. It is a private rite of the intent of a couple to have a child. It is a ceremony performed before Nisheka (conception and impregnation). In some ancient texts, the word simply refers to the rite of passage where the couple have sex to have a child, and no ceremonies are mentioned.

=== Literature ===
Scholars trace Garbhadhana rite to Vedic hymns, such as those in sections 8.35.10 through 8.35.12 of the Rigveda, where repeated prayers for progeny and prosperity are solemnized,

प्रजां च धत्तं द्रविणं च धत्तम्
bestow upon us progeny and affluence

— Rig Veda 8.35.10 - 8.35.12, Translated by Ralph Griffith

The Vedic texts have many passages, where the hymn solemnizes the desire for having a child, without specifying the gender of the child. For example, the Rigveda in section 10.184 states,

Devanagari

विष्णु॒र्योनिं॑ कल्पयतु॒ त्वष्टा॑ रू॒पाणि॑ पिंशतु । आ सि॑ञ्चतु प्र॒जाप॑तिर्धा॒ता गर्भं॑ दधातु ते ॥१॥
गर्भं॑ धेहि सिनीवालि॒ गर्भं॑ धेहि सरस्वति । गर्भं॑ ते अ॒श्विनौ॑ दे॒वावा ध॑त्तां॒ पुष्क॑रस्रजा ॥२॥
हि॒र॒ण्ययी॑ अ॒रणी॒ यं नि॒र्मन्थ॑तो अ॒श्विना॑ । तं त॒त गर्भं॑ हवामहे दश॒मे मा॒सि सूत॑वे ॥३॥

IAST

1.viṣṇu̱ryoni̍ṃ kalpayatu̱ tvaṣṭā̍ rū̱pāṇi̍ piṃśatu .
ā si̍ñcatu pra̱jāpa̍tirdhā̱tā garbha̍ṃ dadhātu te.
2.garbha̍ṃ dhehi sinīvāli̱ garbha̍ṃ dhehi sarasvati .
garbha̍ṃ te a̱śvinau̍ de̱vāvā dha̍ttā̱ṃ puṣka̍rasrajā.
3.hi̱ra̱ṇyayī̍ a̱raṇī̱ yaṃ ni̱rmantha̍to a̱śvinā̍ .
taṃ ta̱ta garbha̍ṃ havāmahe daśa̱me mā̱si sūta̍ve.

English

1. MAY Visnu form and mould the womb, may Tvastar duly shape the forms,
Prajapati infuse the stream, and Dhatar lay the germ for thee.
2. O Sinivali, set the germ, set thou the germ, Sarasvati:
May the Twain Gods bestow the germ, the Asvins crowned with lotuses.
3. That which the Asvins Twain rub forth with the attrition-sticks of gold,
That germ of thine we invocate, that in the tenth month thou mayst bear.

The desire for progeny, without mentioning gender, is in many other books of the Rigveda, such as the hymn 10.85.37. The Atharva Veda, similarly in verse 14.2.2, states a ritual invitation to the wife, by her husband to mount the bed for conception, "being happy in mind, here mount the bed; give birth to children for me, your husband". Later texts, such as the Brihadaranyaka Upanishad, in the last chapter detailing the education of a student, include lessons for his Grihastha stage of life. There, the student is taught, that as a husband, he should cook rice for the wife, and they together eat the food in certain way depending on whether they wish for the birth of a daughter or a son, as follows,

And if a man wishes that a learned daughter should be born to him, and that she should live to her full age, then after having prepared boiled rice with sesamum and butter, they should both eat, being fit to have offspring.

And if a man wishes that a learned son should be born to him, and that he should live his full age, then after having prepared boiled rice with meat and butter, they should both eat, being fit to have offspring.

— Brihadaranyaka Upanishad 6.4.17 - 6.4.18, Translated by Max Muller

The different Grhyasutras differ in their point of view, whether the garbhadhana is to be performed only once, before the first conception, or every time before the couple plan to have additional children. To answer this question, the medieval era texts of various schools discussed and offered diverse views on whether the ritual is a rite of passage for the baby's anticipation in the womb (garbha), or for the wife (kshetra). A rite of passage of the baby would imply that Garbhadhana sanskara is necessary for each baby and therefore every time the couple intend to have a new baby, while a rite of passage of the wife would imply a one time ritual suffices.

== Ceremony ==
According to the Grhya Sutras, at the beginning of the performance of this saṃskāra, the wife dressed up and the husband recited Vedic verses consisting similes of natural creation and invocations to gods for helping his wife in conception. The rite of passage marked the milestone where both husband and wife agreed to have a child and raise a family together.

== See also ==
- Saṃskāra
