= Nishkramana =

Hindu rite of passage marking first outing

Nishkramana (Sanskrit: निष्क्रमण, Niṣkramaṇa) (literally, first outing) is the sixth of the 16 saṃskāras (sacraments) practiced by the Hindus. On the day of the Nishkramana, a square area in the courtyard from where sun can be seen is plastered with cow dung and clay and the sign of svastika is marked on it. The mother of the child scatters grains of rice over it. The child is brought by a nurse, and the ceremony ends when the father makes the child look at the sun with the sound of the conch-shell and the chanting of Vedic hymns. According to the Manusmriti (II.34), in the fourth month after birth, the Nishkramana of the child should be performed. According to the Yamasmriti, quoted in Viramitrodaya, a child should see the sun in the third month and the moon in the fourth month after birth.
