= Karnavedha =

Hindu rite of passage with ear piercing

Karnavedha (Sanskrit: कर्णवेध, Karṇavedha) or Karnavedham is one of the sixteen major samskaras (sacraments) known as "Shodasha Samskaras" of Hinduism. It is an ear piercing ceremony that is typically performed between the first and fifth years of life. This can also be performed during later years.

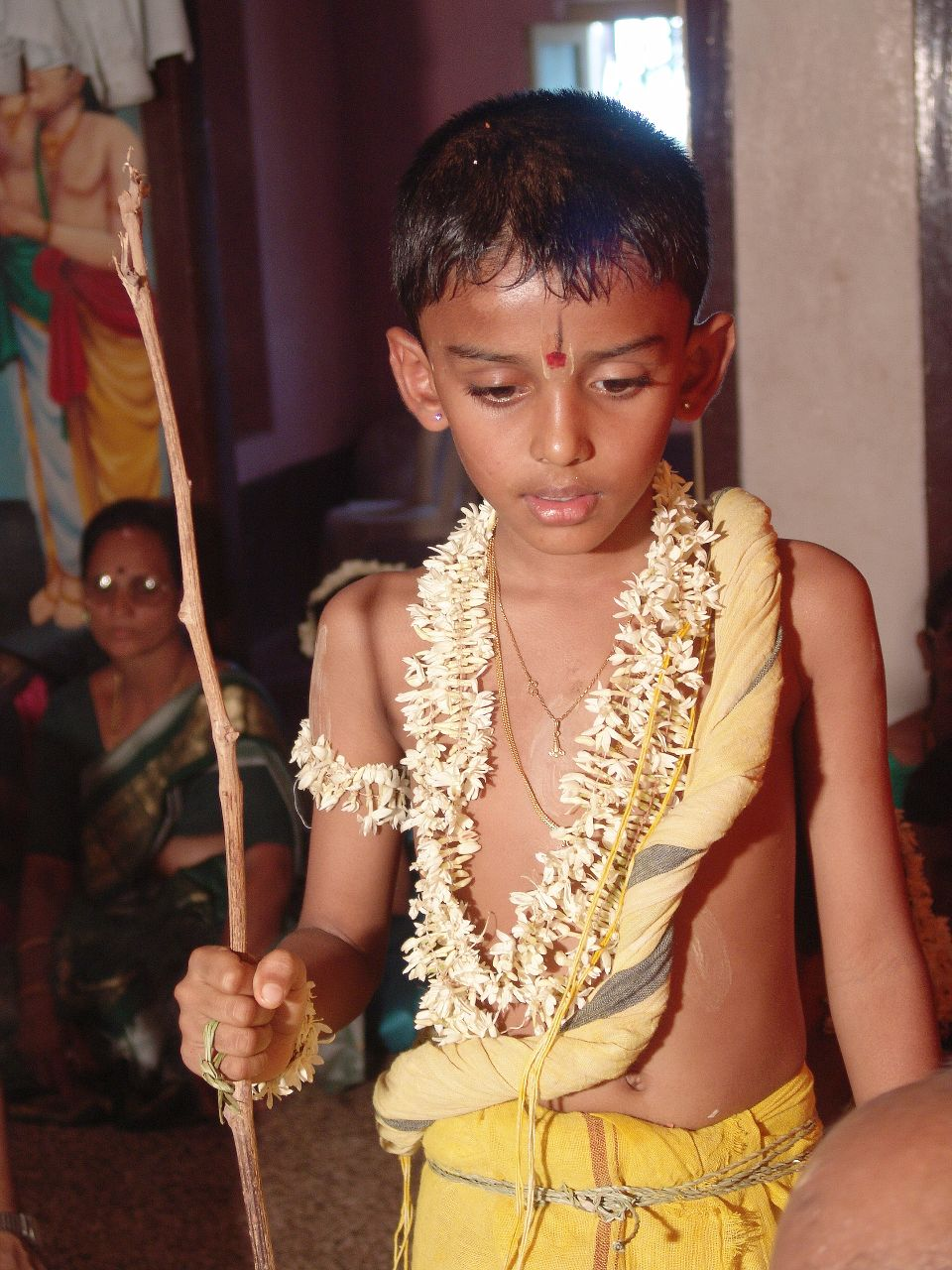
Karnavedham of Brahmin boy (both ears pierced)

Brahmins, especially those studying the vedas, undergo karnavedha and the other samskaras during their lifetime. The samskaras are mentioned in the Brahmana portion of the vedas. Some scholars advise that the performance of karnavedha should be considered just as important as upanayanam (sacred thread ceremony - another major samskara) and the other sacraments as each holds its own symbolic spiritual value.

While equally recommended for males and females, in modern times, karnavedha has become an uncommon practice amongst males.

Karnavedha is considered a vedic rite of passage with symbolic spiritual significance. Some believe that it is intended to open the inner ears for receiving sacred sounds. Hearing of sacred sounds with concentration is considered meritorious in that it cleanses the mind and nurtures the spirit.

During certain medieval periods, "karnavedha" became associated with religious attire and its performance became obligatory to the extent that its non-performance became regarded as sinful among some communities.
