= Twante Thein Tan =

Twante Thein Tan တွံတေးသိန်းတန်
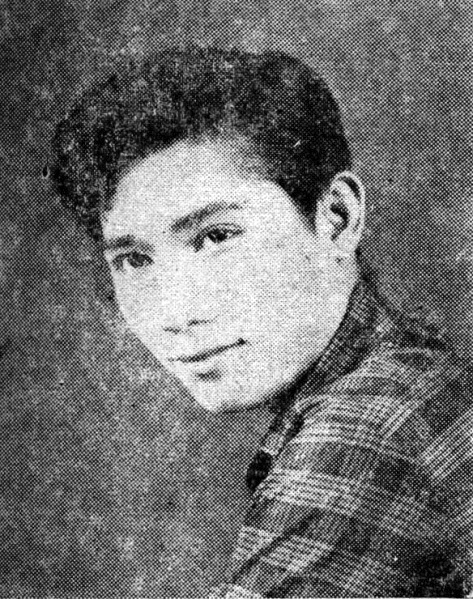

Background information
- Born: Maung Thein Tan; 26 September 1941; Twante, Myanmar
- Died: 11 January 1999 (aged 57)
- Occupations: Singer-songwriter; composer; actor; film director

Twante Thein Tan was a Burmese singer, songwriter, actor, and film director. He starred in the popular Burmese movie Me, and You, and Padauk Blossoms (ကိုယ်ရယ် မင်းရယ် ပန်းပိတောက်ရယ်).

He was particularly recognised for his songs, such as "Pan Nwe Ga Sein"(ပန်းနွယ်ကစိမ်း) and "Nham laat shot nay laytot". His songs often describe the natural beauty of the countryside and depict the lives of rural people.

== Early life ==
He was born Maung Thein Tan in Twante, Yangon Region, on September 26, 1941. His father was British by the name of U Nyunt, and his mother's name was Daw Chit Tin. He was the fifth child in a family of six.

== Albums ==
- Myat Nar Wine
- Special Mingalar Couple (2013)
- Ko a Hlei
- Soe Moe Myittar
- Mya Hnin Si
- Thaw Nuetra Nei Ma Tu Tei Ngar

== Death ==
He died of liver cancer in Yangon on January 11, 1999.
