= Odia Hindu wedding =

Bahaghara (Odia: ଓଡ଼ିଆ ବାହାଘର) is the Hindu wedding ceremony performed by Odia people in the Indian state of Odisha. It is the main ritual of an Odia Hindu wedding.

The wedding rituals are performed at the Duara (home of the bride) and Tola kanias (home of the groom).

== Engagement ==
The engagement ceremony is known as nirbandha (Odia: ନିର୍ବନ୍ଧ) or lagna dharaa (Odia: ଲଗ୍ନଧରା). The ritual takes place either in the home of the bride or a temple. Traditionally, prasada (sanctified food) that has been offered to Jagannath is given to the couple. During the ceremony, fathers of the bride and groom hold sacred articles and make a vow, sankalpa, to wed their children to each other. This is considered a commitment (vaak nischaya) after which the families proceed with making marriage arrangements, and it is accompanied by an exchange of gifts. Historical ethnographic records from Odisha also describe nirbandha as the stage at which a marriage agreement is formally fixed, often with gifts and the setting of the wedding date.

== Invitations ==
There is the custom of sending betel nuts to family and friends for inviting them to the marriage.

=== Badhi jai anukuḷa ceremony ===
Jwaiñ anukuḷa ceremony marks the initiation of marriage rituals which happen in the bridegroom's house. This is followed by the distribution of Nimantraṇa patra (invitation cards).

=== Distribution of invitations ===
The first invitation is sent to the family deity as a respect to the lord.

Deva Nimantrana: Nimantrana or Invitation marks the public announcement of the marriage function. As per Odia custom, the first card is sent to the family divinity. Usually the first card is placed before Lord Jagannath.

Moula Nimantrana: The second invitation goes to the bride and groom's maternal uncle. This is called Moula Nimantrana. This has to go with some family member in person along with beetel nuts. Uncle or "Mamu" is one of the most respectable persons in events like marriages. Invitations can now be distributed among friends and relatives.

Jwaiñ Nimantrana: Next to "Mamu", "Jwaiñ" or son-in-law of the family is the most respectable invitee in marriages. In "Odia Sanskruti" and probably many other Indian customs, the "Jwain Nimantrana" ritual has an important significance. The Bride side father and other important person from family go to groom house with "Sweekar" and invite the groom. As per Odia rituals, no female should accompany them for this invite. Also, there is a strong religious reason for the same:

As per Hindu theology, when "Dakshya Prajapati" arranged for a great Yajna ("Hawan"), he intentionally did not invite his son-in-law "Lord Shiva". Wanting to visit her parents, relatives and childhood friends, Sati sought to rationalize this omission. She reasoned within herself that her parents had neglected to make a formal invitation to them only because within family, such formality was unnecessary; certainly, she needed no invitation to visit her own mother and would go anyway. So, despite dissuasion from Shiva. Sati wanted to go. So finally Shiva let her go with his ganas. However, upon reaching there within no time Sati realized this mean intention of his father to offend Shiva. Sati was very upset by thinking herself as the cause of this dishonour to her husband. She was consumed by rage against her father and loathing for his mentality. Unable to bear this disrespect to her husband, Sati invoked her yogic powers and immolated herself. Shiva sensed this catastrophe, and his rage was incomparable. He loved Sati more than anything. He devastated the "Yajna" and supposedly slapped "Dakshya Prajapati" that Dakshya was beheaded by Shiva's stroke. Dakshya's head fell in the Yajna Agni. (later upon God's request, Shiva gave rebirth to Dakshya by replacing a goat head). Shiva was then with rage goes into Tandava. Learning a lesson from this, the significance of "Jwain Nimantrana" came into effect, so that no one else should ever think of insulting the son-in-law of a family in ceremonies.

== Mangana ==
The ceremony of Mangana is done one day before marriage mostly during afternoon. During 'mangana' people bless the bride and groom and then anointing turmeric paste on her body followed by the bride's ceremonial bath where turmeric paste (haḷadi baṭā) is put on her body by seven un-widowed women. Similarly the groom also undergoes turmeric anointment by his sister-in-law whose husband is alive.

=== Jāiragaḍa anukuḷa ===
It is a ceremony, which marks the stoking of the fire. The uncooked pulses are ground with help of mortar and pestle and the paste is sent for preparing Dahl, Pitha etc.

=== Diañ manguḷā puja(Gandhasana:ଗନ୍ଧଷଣ) ===
Diañ manguḷā puja is conducted at the gramadevati's temple. Baarikiyani (wife of a barber) offers the bride's bangles, toe ring, sindura and sari to the Goddess. During the Diañ mangaḷā Puja prayers are offered to the deity of a temple. The bridal saree, toe rings, shanka Pola and sindura (Vermilion) are offered before the Lord by the barber and the blessings of the Gods invoked for a long and happy married life. Later the father of groom and bride invoke each other's ancestors with a ritual called Nandimukha.

=== Arrival of the groom ===
The groom along with his marriage procession arrives at the wedding venue. This is known as Barajatri. Barajātri or Varaanugamana is the ceremonial procession when the groom and his family members and friends arrive at the wedding mandap amid great pomp and magnificence. Upon arrival of the barajatree the groom is greeted with alati or tilak followed by washing the feet of groom with tender coconut water and offering of curd mixed with honey and ghee. The bride is decorated with fine traditional jewelry. The groom is received into the bride's house by the younger brother of the bride, who carries the groom on his shoulder. Odia brides are traditionally dressed in yellow sarees with red borders called as Boula Patta for the wedding. However, these days, red, pink and orange outfits are also common.

When the bride is informed of the groom's arrival, she takes a ceremonial bath called Baadua Pani Gadhua.

== Wedding rituals ==
In Odia marriage rituals, the mother of the bridegroom does not take part in the ceremony.

=== Kanyadāna ===
The wedding ritual begins with the Kanyādana ceremony which is held on the vivaha vedi. This structure is decorated with many flowers and leaves. This is the traditional ritual of handing over the daughter to the groom. The customary fire is lit and the priests chant the mantras. In this custom, the bride's father gives his daughter's hand to the groom with the promise that going forward bridegroom will take care of her.

=== Saptapadi ===
Seven heaps of rice grain symbolizing the seven hills and the saptakulaparwata are worshipped during the Saptapadi rite. The couple takes seven rounds around the fire symbolizing the sacred fire as the witness for the marriage.

=== Hāta ganṭhi phita ===
This ritual called Hata Ganthi or Pani Grahana onwards the bride considers herself as member of her husband's family instead. That's why bride is called "duhita" (Odia: ଦୁହିତା), meaning who is grown up in two families to do good for them at respective phase i.e. before marriage bride considers her parental family as her home and is considered auspicious to them. Similarly after marriage the bride is loyal to her husband's family and is treated auspicious as the daughter-in-law (Odia: କୂଳ ବଧୁ) of her new family.

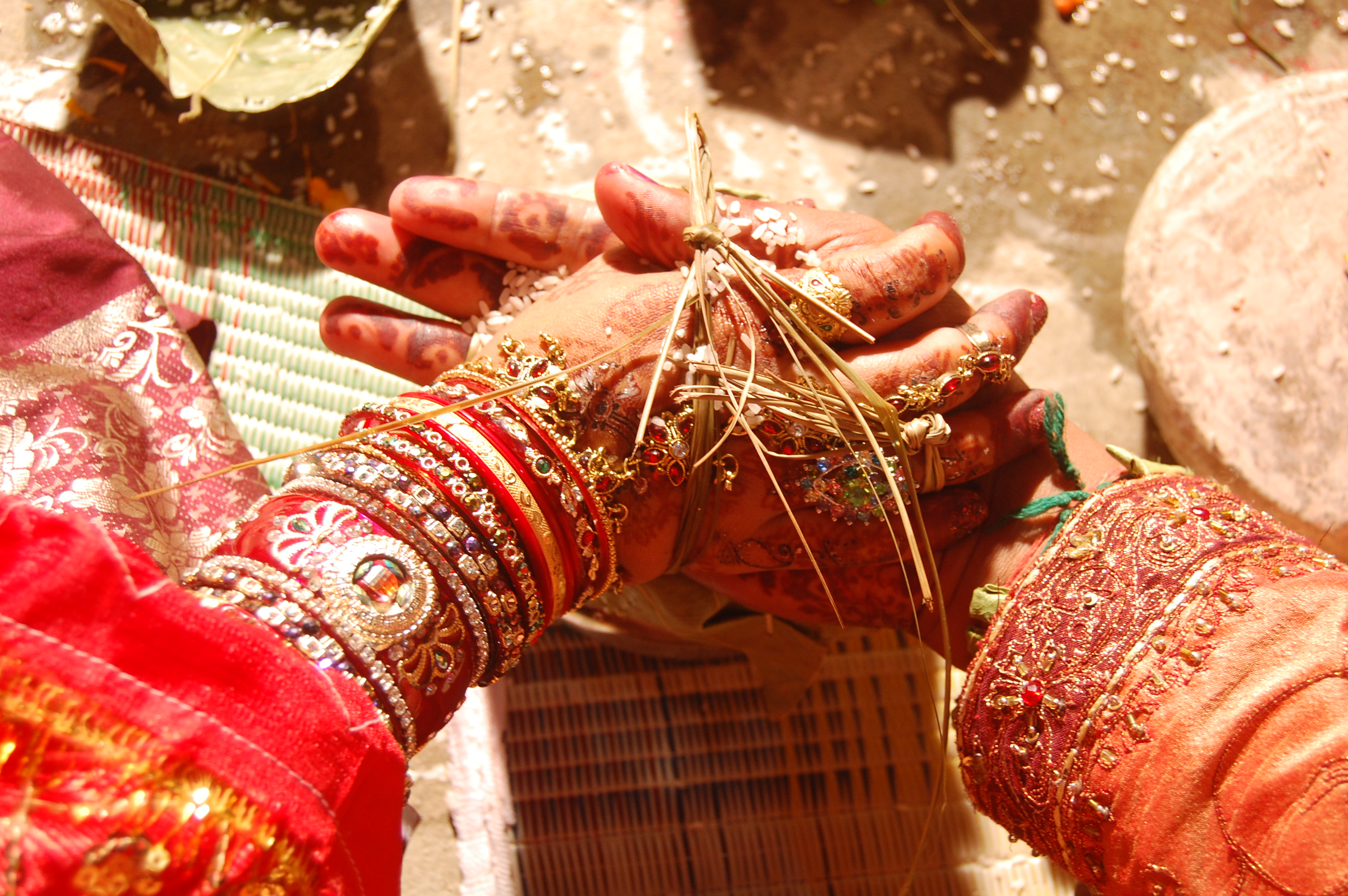
Hata Ganthi, or Panigrahana ritual of tying knot by keeping the bride's palm on groom's

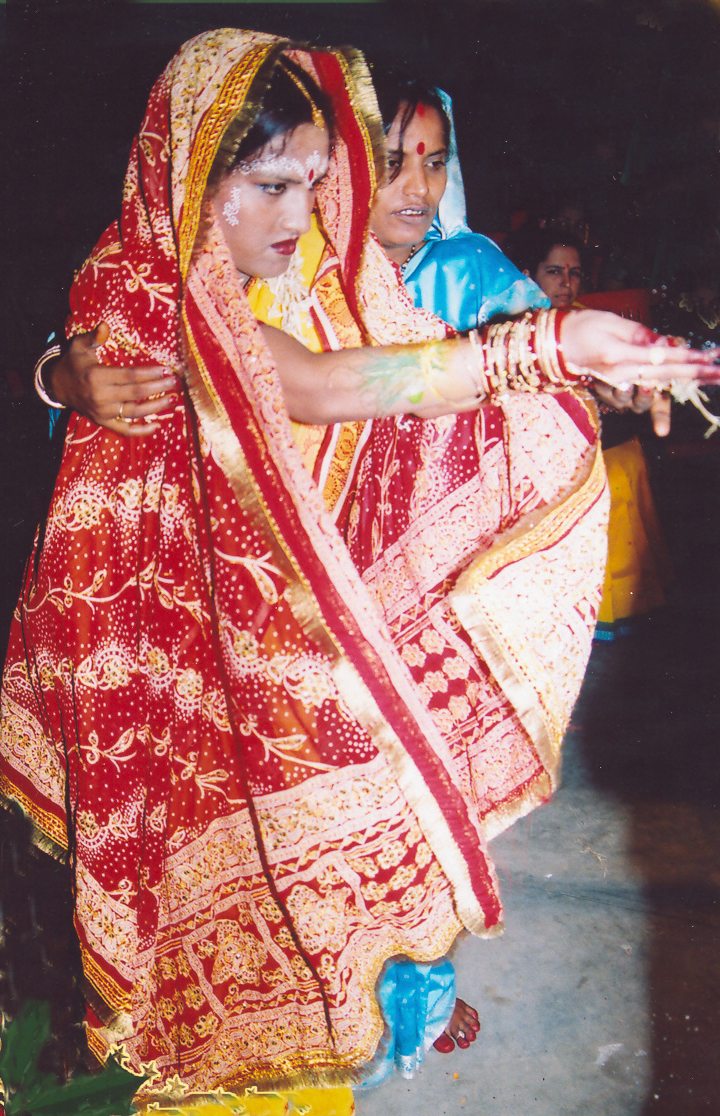
An Odia bride offering khai on fire during marriage at the time of Lajja Homa or Khai poda

During hāta ganṭhi, the bridegroom takes seven rounds around the holy fire of homa, to the chant of mantras and slokas. A garland made of mango leaves which is considered as a holy symbol is bound by keeping the bride's hand along with bride groom's hand. 'Laja' or 'Khai' (Odia: ଖଇ) (puffed rice), a symbol of prosperity is offered to the fire which is called "khaiporḍā" (burning khai) considering the bride as an avatar of Laxmi who brings wealth and prosperity to the new home. 'Khai' is tossed onto the path of the newly wed while they enter the home, the new bride tilts a vessel filled with rice with her right feet making the rice spills over the ground to make a way to her new home.

The bride's brother stands behind the couple while the couple faces each other. The bride places her hands on the grooms and her brother puts the puffed rice into them. Together they offer this laja as 'ahuti' or sacrifice to the God of fire amidst the chanting of mantras. There is also a custom of bride's brother gives a punch on the back of the bridegroom which is called "Saḷā bidhā" (ଶଳା ବିଧା, Saḷā means wife's brother and bidhā means punch). Finally the knot is opened by younger sister of the bride or Shaali. The groom and bride go to see the pole star Polaris. The groom applies Sindura on the hair parting of bride and Shankha on arms (the vermilion powder and bangles ) which is called Sinduradaan.

=== Kauḍi kheḷa ===
Kauḍi kheḷa (Literally Kaudi-playing, Odia: କଉଡ଼ି ଖେଳ) is a custom of playing Kauḍi/ Kauri, a white colored shining shell which is played by the newlywed couple after the marriage ceremony. Kauḍi/kauri is believed to be bringing wealth, harmony and prosperity to the family. The bridegroom first holds a Kauḍi in his fist and the bride tries to break the fist and get it by two of her hands. In the next round the bride make a tight fist with both of her hands with the Kauḍi inside and the bridegroom tries to open her hand with only one hand. Rounds of such games go on, the sisters and other younger members of the bride's family carry this custom where one elder lady from the bride's family assumes the role of judge.

=== Sāsu dahi pakhāḷa khiā ===
Sāsu dahi pakhāḷa khiā (Odia: ଶାଶୁ ଦହି ପଖାଳ ଖିଆ) is a custom of the bride's mother feeding food to her new son-in-law. After the Kauḍi kheḷa is over the bride's mother makes the bridegroom sits on her lap feeds him with curd-Pakhāḷa with Baigana poda (Spiced eggplant mash). After this both the bride and bridegroom play a certain game to test the strength and intelligence of the groom.

=== Kāndaṇā (bāhunā) ===
"Mathā Khaṅkā Bāhunā" (hair-braiding bahuna) in Baleswari Odia

Bahuna in Baleswari Odia

Kāndaṇā (Odia: କାନ୍ଦଣା) or bāhunā (Odia: ବାହୁନା) is a rhythmic weeping song sung by the bride as well as other women of her family.

== Post-wedding rituals ==
=== Gruhaprabesa tradition ===
Lajā homa is the conclusion of the wedding. The newly wed couple arrives at the new home where the groom's family gives her a ceremonial welcome called Gruhaprabesa. The bride, along with her husband enters her new home i.e. her in-laws place, where the groom's family gives them a warm welcome.

=== Chauṭhi/Bāsara rāti ===
On fourth day after marriage bride and bride groom meet each other. This day is called 'Chauṭhi' (means the fourth day) and the night is called Bāsara rāti (Odia: ବାସର ରାତି) or Chauṭhi rati (Odia: ଚଉଠି ରାତି). During the day, there is chaturthi pinda daana i.e., a type of shraddh like ritual in which the ancestors of the groom's family are paid homage especially in the evening, puja and homa are practiced which includes burning a coconut to make it roasted inside. A room along with bed is decorated with bright fragrant flowers like Rajanigandha. This is the night of consummation. The bride glows a bāsara dipa alongside the bed as a symbol of long lasting glowing relationship. The couple is offered to eat the roasted coconut (charu) from the homa during the night. There is also a tradition of the bride carrying a glass of kesara dudha (saffron milk) to the bridegroom. This ritual is also commonly known as Nisheka in Indian tradition. This is especially important because marriage is not considered complete or valid until consummation.

=== Asṭa mangaḷā custom ===
The bride and the bridegroom are invited to the bride's house on the eighth day after the wedding known as Asṭa mangaḷā. Traditional Odia cuisine is prepared and served for the newly married couple.

A Shankha (conch shell) is blown along with a specific sound called huḷu-huḷi by placing the tongue on the roof of the mouth with repeated opening and closing of mouth.

== Wedding outfits ==
=== Bridegroom attire ===
The Odia bridegroom (bara, Odia: ବର) wears dhoti (dhuti) and kurta (Punjabi) or sometimes drapes a white silk cloth around known as the "joḍa (ଜୋଡ଼)". In the post-wedding reception, the groom wears formal attire, traditional Odia clothing (sherwani) or western outfit (blazer and formals). Dhoti is worn, or rather draped around, the waist in a particular pattern. Generally a white or cream colored dhoti is worn. A scarf like cloth called "uttariya" (Odia: ଜୋଡ଼) is put on left side of the shoulder. While the wedding rituals are on, the groom wears the "jorḍa (Odia: ଜୋଡ଼)", a white colored silk cloth draped around the bare body of the groom.

=== Bridal attire ===
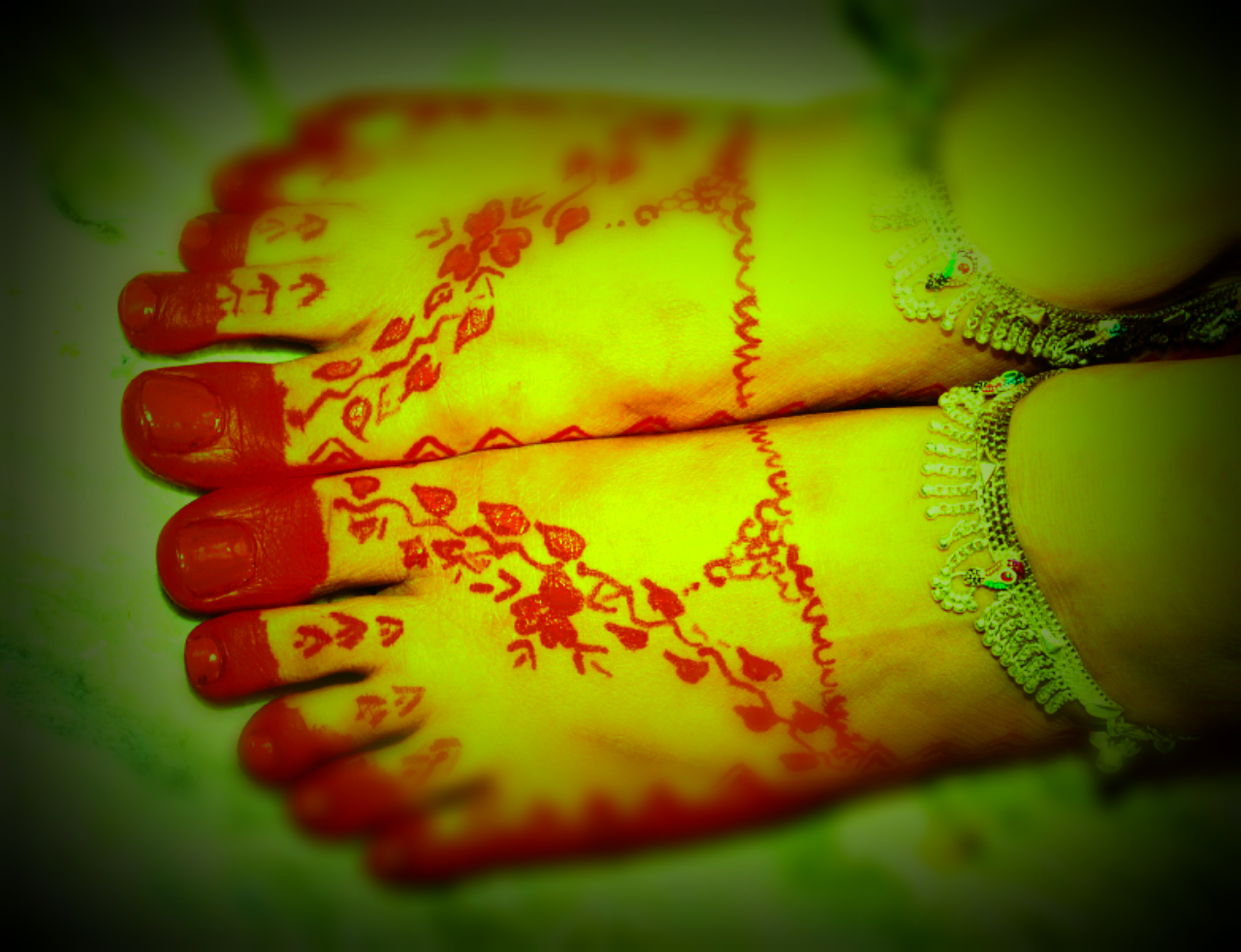
"Aḷatā pindha" (Decorating feet with Alata, a red liquid that is used to paint the feet of the bride and groom during marriage)

The bride (kaniañ, Odia: କନ୍ୟା) in Odisha wears a traditional red sari (Odia: ଶାଢ଼ୀ). She is adorned with fine gold jewelry as well as bangles. In some parts of Odisha the bride wears shanka Palaa (white and red bangles); in other parts, Sankha (red bangles) is mandatory. The bride's mother, female relatives, and her friends decorate the bride.

Traditional Odia saris used during weddings include:

- Sambalpuri Saree of Sambalpur
- Ikkat of Bargarh
- Khandua (both Silk & Cotton) of Cuttack
- Bomkai or Sonepuri Sari (Silk & Cotton) of Subarnapur
- Berhampur Patta of Bramhapur
- Matha silk or Tussar Silk of Mayurbhanj
- Bapta cloth (Silk & Cotton) of Koraput
- Tanta Cotton of Baleswar

== Cultural norms ==
There are subtle differences in the rites observed by different castes. The Utkala Brahmins have their weddings only in the daytime, preferably at midday or in the morning, while the other caste weddings are done during the evening or night. Marriages in Odisha are mostly fixed and arranged by the parents.

Traditionally, widow remarriage is allowed in some lower caste, in this case the younger brother is allowed to marry the deceased brother's wife. (The social stigma of widows remarrying is still prevalent in the Odia society )

=== Arranging the wedding ===
The wedding is arranged by the elders of both the family. The arrangement depends on the family values and traditions. Some families consider the horoscope matching mandatory. The better the match, the happier will be the couple's married life. However, the marriage largely depends on the bride and groom's mutual acceptance to each other and to both the families.
