= Baraat =

Type of Hindu wedding procession

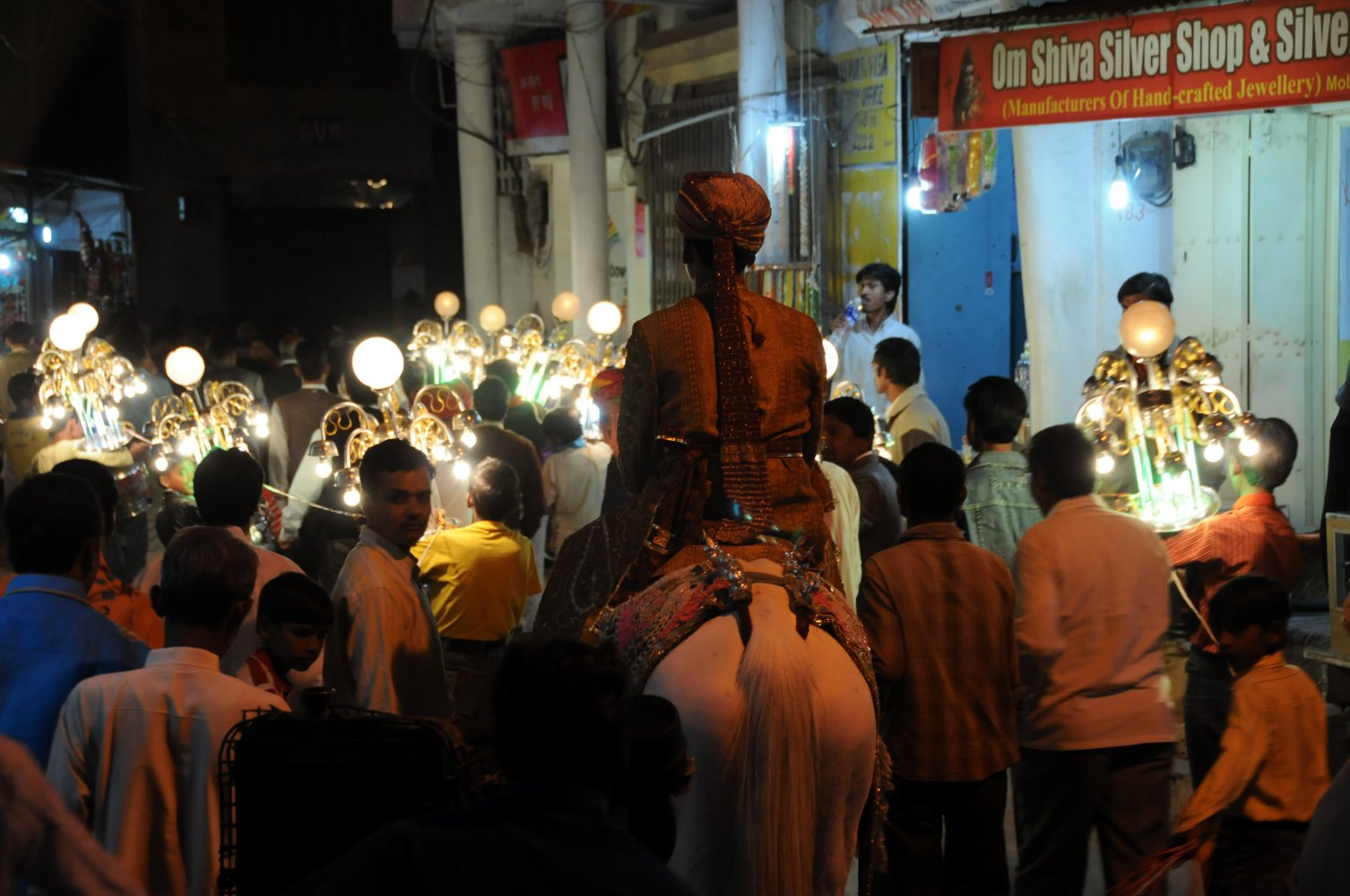
An Indian Hindu wedding procession, baraat, with the bridegroom on a horse, led by a brass band, Pushkar, Rajasthan.

Baraat, also known as Varayatra, is a groom's wedding procession among various communities in the Indian subcontinent. In the tradition, the groom has to travel to the wedding venue (often the bride's house) accompanied by his family members and friends.

In the previous eras, the groom used to travel on a mare, chariots or even elephants, though now often travel on vintage cars. The baraat can become a large procession, with its own band, dancers, and budget. The groom and his horse are covered in finery and do not usually take part in the dancing and singing; that is left to the "baraatis" or people accompanying the procession. The groom usually carries a sword. The term baraati is also more generically used to describe any invitee from the groom's side. Traditionally, baraatis are attended to as guests of the bride's family.

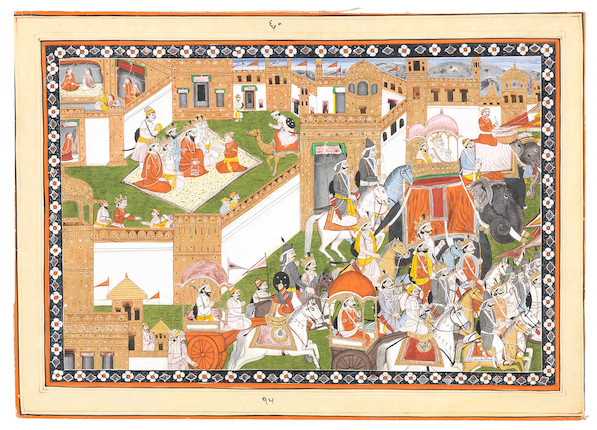
A painting depicting the procession before the marriage of Shri Krishna and Rukmini in the Mahabharata Pahari, probably Mandi, circa 1840.

The baraat, headed by a display of fireworks and accompanied by the rhythm of the dhol, reaches the meeting point, where the elders of both the families meet. In north Indian Hindu weddings, the groom is greeted with garlands, tilak and aarti. In traditional baraats, the groom is welcomed at the venue with the sound of shehnais or nadaswaram, which are considered auspicious at weddings by Hindus.

== Etymology ==
The word Baraat is derived from Sanskrit word Varayātrā (वरयात्रा) literally meaning groom's procession. In Bengali, the baraat is usually referred to as "Borjatri" (বরযাত্রী) when the groom along with his family members, friends and closest relatives leave for the bride's home which is the venue of the marriage.

== Dogra Baraat ==
In Dogra tradition, baraat is organized with great pomp and show. It is also known as Janjh in Dogri. When the groom gets ready, he is adorned with Sehra by his maternal uncle. This is known as Sehrabandhi. After this, Ghodi-chadha takes place where groom rides the horse with sword in his hand. The horse is offered fodder and chana daal. The sisters of groom adorn groom with necklaces of gold or silver or even currency notes. Dogri folk songs called ghodia are sung. And sisters in law apply kajal on groom's eyes. Dhol and musical instruments are played and the family members and friends of groom dance in joy. The baraat halts temporarily at local Mandir for darshan. This ceremony is called Dev Karaj. In older times, when baraat used to travel long distances, then women of household used to stay at home. They would celebrate the marriage by performing Jagarna dance. When the baraat reaches wedding venue, fireworks are displayed. The groom is welcomed by his mother in law by applying tilak & aarti and offering him sweets and Dogra dish Suchi. After this, the ceremony of Milini takes place. Relatives of both the groom and bride meet and exchange gifts. Ladies from the bride's side may then sing a special song called sidnya (humorous song). After the completion of wedding rituals, the groom typically will bring the bride to his home.

== Kauravi Baraat ==
The Kuru region comprises parts of Western Uttar Pradesh, Delhi, parts of Haryana and Lower Uttarakhand; where Kauravi dialect is spoken. The region has its distinct culture and nuptial traditions.

In this region, Baraat consists of traditions like Ghudchadhi, Mandir darshan, Janvāsā etc. Ghudchadhi is the ceremony where bridegroom rides over the horse. The procession of family members and friends then proceeds to a Mandir to seek blessings. After that baraat reaching the wedding venue is welcomed and rest marriage ceremonies are completed. The bridegroom then brings bride from Janvāsā to his home.

== Marathi Varaat ==
In Marathi tradition, bridegroom's procession is called 'Varaat' and is accompanied by family members and relatives. After completion of wedding customs, the bride and groom carry the silver image of Goddess Gauri which the bride had worshipped during Gaurihar Puja (custom performed before the beginning of wedding).

== Kumaoni Baraat ==
In Kumaon region of Uttarakhand, Baraat is associated with special nuptial songs called Phaag which are initiated by a priestess. The procession is a accompanied with band which plays instruments like dhol & dammu. On arrival at wedding venue, the groom is welcomed by the bride's family by applying tilak, performing aarti. This ceremony is known as Dulighray.

== Odia Baraat or Barjaatri or Varanugaman ==
In Odia language, Baraat is also called Barjaatri or Varanugaman where Bar (Var) means groom, jaatra (yaatra) means procession/journey and anugaman means arrival. In this ceremonial procession the groom and his family members and friends arrive at the wedding mandap amid great pomp and magnificence. Aarti and Tilak of groom is performed and he is also offered curd mixed with honey or jaggery.

== Bengali Boraat or Borjatri ==
In Bengali tradition, Bor Jatri is basically the baraat, where the groom, his family and friends dress up for the wedding and start their journey to the bride’s house or the wedding venue. After the bor jatri or the baraat reaches the bride’s place, the bride’s mother along with other family members welcome the groom by blowing shankhs (conch shells) and his side of the family by doing aarti with the holy lamp and serving the sweets and drinks.

== Punjabi Baraat ==
Both men and women participate in the procession of a Punjabi baraat (also known as jaññ). Close male relatives of both the bride and groom always wear turbans, which indicates honor. When the baraat arrives at the wedding venue, a ceremony known as the milni (literally, meeting or merger) is carried out, in which equivalent relatives from the groom and bride's sides greet each other.

== Rajput Baraat ==
The bridegroom is usually dressed in a gold achkan, with an orange turban and a churidar or jodhpurs with juttis. The baraat members also must wear achkans or sherwanis with jodhpurs and safas (colorful turbans). The procession to the bride's house looks rather regal as there is absolutely no dancing on the streets by the baraatis. In fact, all members, including the groom who rides an elephant or a female horse, carry swords. The horse is important for Rajputs.

== Gujarati Baraat or Varghodo ==
In a Gujarati wedding, the groom arrives at the bride's house on a horse and is followed by a dancing procession led by his family members and friends is called Varghodo or Jaan. They are also accompanied by a group of band members playing instrumental music. The groom, in reverence, touches feet of mother-in-law. A playful ritual where mother in law grabs nose of groom is performed which is a reminder to groom that mother-in-law is giving her beloved and precious daughter to him, so he should be humble and grateful.

== Nepali-Sikkimese Baraat or Janti ==
In Nepal and Sikkim state of India, Baraat is also known by the name Janti & Baryatra. Janti or Baryatra is the groom's wedding procession which goes from his house to the bride's to bring her to his house. The Janti consisting of the groom's family members, relatives and friends, sets out for the bride's home. It is accompanied by a musical band, indulges in dance and merrymaking all along the way.

== Telugu Edurukolu ==
In Telugu weddings, Edurukolu ceremony is the equivalent of Baraat ceremony. In Edurukolu ceremony, the groom's procession is grandly welcomed by the bride's party amidst traditional music of 'Nadaswaram'/'Sannai Melam'. The groom and his parents are specially welcomed by the bride's parents when the bride's mother applies 'kumkum' on the groom's and his mother's forehead followed by 'Harati' (waving the plate with burning camphor) to the groom.

== Kannada/Tulu Dibbana ==
The wedding processions in Kannada & Tuluva tradition are referred to as Dibbana. The start of Dibbana procession is preceded by Vāhana Pujā where prayer is performed using kumkum & coconut for safe journey of the groom. The groom and his family members and friends adorn Peta (Mysore cap). Musicians play instruments like nadaswaram. On arrival at marriage venue, groom is welcomed using Akshat (rice) and Aarti.

== Tamil Janavasam ==
The groom's procession in Tamil tradition is known by the name Janavasam. During Janavasam, the groom boards a beautifully decorated car. He is accompanied by a large marriage procession of close friends and relatives. Professional musicians are invited to entertain the procession, by playing traditional wedding songs. Fireworks form a part of the marriage celebrations. The bride's brother puts garland around the groom's neck, in order to welcome him at the entrance of the kalyana mandapam (wedding hall).

== Rajasthani Baraat ==
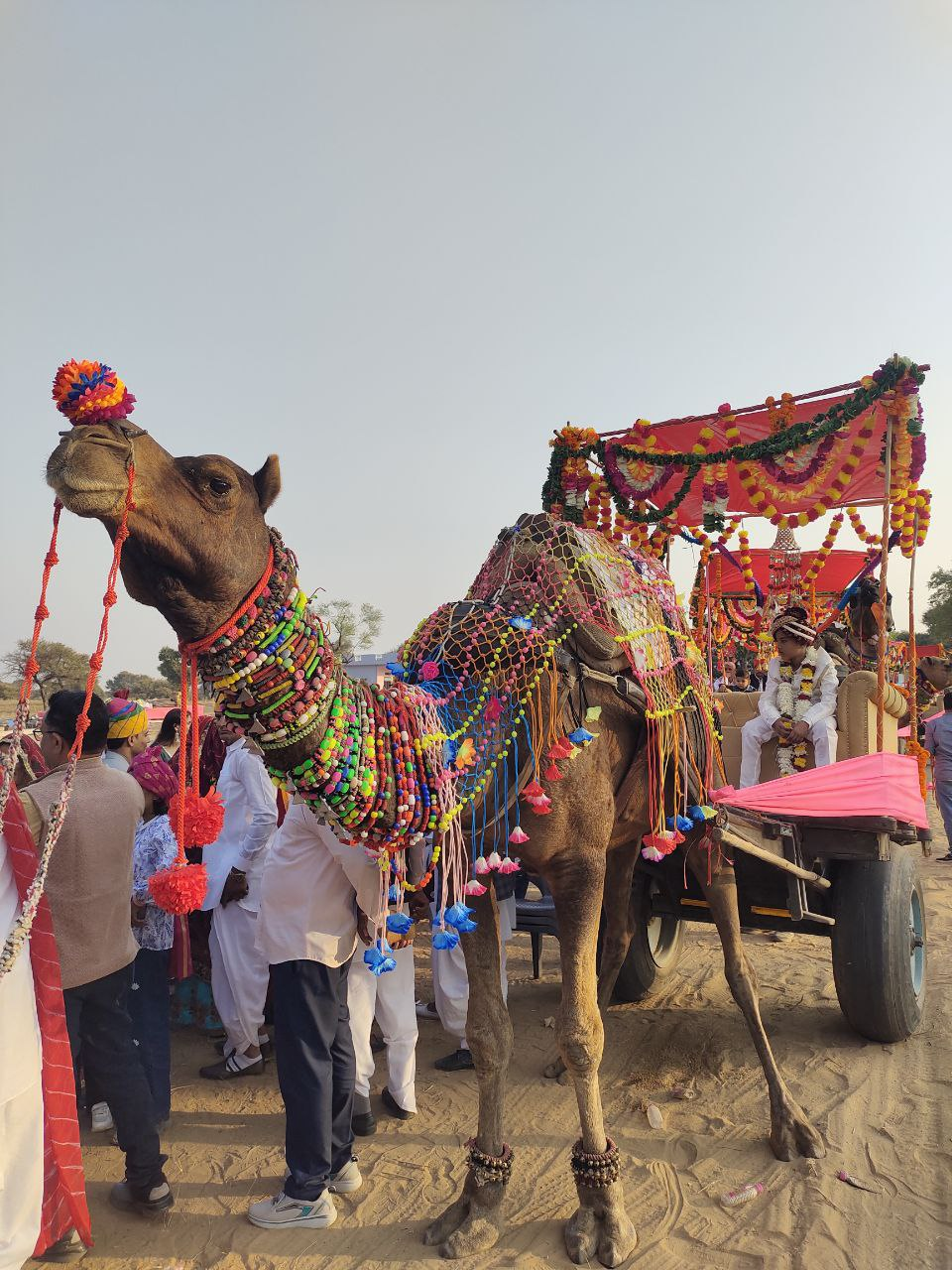
Rajasthani groom seated in a camel cart

Baarat on camels is a traditional feature of wedding processions in Rajasthan, India. Camels have been an integral part of Rajasthani culture for centuries, serving as a primary mode of transportation and a symbol of wealth and status. In a typical Rajasthani wedding, the groom arrives at the bride's home or the wedding venue on camel itself or a cart pulled by a camel decorated with fabrics and embroidery. The groom, dressed in traditional attire, often wears a turban and carries a ceremonial sword.

The baarat is accompanied by a lively procession of family members, friends, and musicians. Traditional Rajasthani folk music and dance, including the Ghoomar dance, are performed to celebrate the joyous event.

== Controversies ==
Being a tradition of affluence practiced by forward-caste communities, violence against Dalit communities who choose to practice it have increased. Brides have begun riding horses, a tradition restricted to grooms in the past.

Calls for horse-free weddings in light of cruelty towards the horses and other animals involved have been garnering increased attention, with revisionist modifications to the traditions not involving the exploitation of animals being increasingly preferred.

PETA India launched a campaign urging against the involvement of horses in wedding ceremonies while highlighting the use of spiked bits that are prohibited under Rule 8 of The Prevention of Cruelty to Draught and Pack Animals Rules, 1965. Malnourishment and cruelty in terms of exposure to loud noises and crowds were also highlighted.

The Indian organization People for Animals says that horses are sentient beings capable of experiencing pain and has promoted alternatives such as the traditions of using palanquins.
