= Hindu wedding =

Wedding ceremony in Hinduism

A Hindu wedding, also known as vivaha (विवाह,) in Hindi, lagna (लग्न) in Marathi, biyah (बियाह) in Bhojpuri, Maithil Vivah in Maithili, bibaho (বিবাহ) in Bengali, bahaghara (ବାହାଘର) or bibaha (ବିବାହ) in Odia, tirumanam (திருமணம்) in Tamil, pelli (పెళ్లి) in Telugu, maduve (ಮದುವೆ) in Kannada, and kalyanam (कल्याणम्, కళ్యాణం; കല്യാണം) in Malayalam and other languages, is the traditional marriage ceremony for Hindus.

The weddings celebrations may extend for several days and involve large number of participants. The bride's and groom's homes—entrance, walls, floor, roof—are sometimes decorated with colors, flowers, lights and other decorations.

The word vivāha originated as a sacred union of two people as per Vedic traditions, i.e. what many call marriage, but based on cosmic laws and advanced ancient practices. Under Vedic Hindu traditions, marriage is viewed as one of the saṁskāras performed during the life of a human being, which are lifelong commitments of one wife and one husband. In India, marriage has been looked upon as having been designed by the cosmos and considered as a "sacred oneness witnessed by fire itself." Hindu families have traditionally been patrilocal.

The Arya Samaj movement popularized the term Vedic wedding among the Hindu expatriates in north during the colonial era, it was however prevalent in south India even before. The roots of this tradition are found in hymn 10.85 of the Rigveda Shakala samhita, which is also called the "Rigvedic wedding hymn".

At each step, promises are made by each to the other. The primary witness of a Hindu marriage is the fire-deity (or the Sacred Fire) Agni, in the presence of family and friends. The ceremony is traditionally conducted entirely or at least partially in Sanskrit, considered by Hindus as the language of holy ceremonies. The local language of the bride and groom may also be used. The rituals are prescribed in the Gruhya sutra composed by various rishis such as Apastamba, Baudhayana and Ashvalayana.

The pre-wedding and post-wedding rituals and celebrations vary by region, preference and the resources of the groom, bride and their families. They can range from one day to multi-day events. Pre-wedding rituals include engagement, which involves vagdana (betrothal) and Lagna-patra (written declaration), and Varyatra— the arrival of the groom's party at the bride's residence, often as a formal procession with dancing and music. The post-wedding ceremonies may include Abhisheka, Anna Prashashana, Aashirvadah, and Grihapravesa – the welcoming of the bride to her new home. The wedding marks the start of the Grhastha (householder) stage of life for the new couple. In India, by law and tradition, no Hindu marriage is binding or complete unless the ritual of seven steps and vows in presence of fire (Saptapadi) is completed by the bride and the groom together. This requirement is under debate, given that several Hindu communities (such as the Nairs of Kerala or Bunts of Tulu Nadu) do not observe these rites. Approximately 90% of marriages in India are still arranged. Despite the rising popularity of love marriages, especially among younger generations, arranged marriages continue to be the predominant method for finding a marriage partner in India.

== Institution of marriage ==
According to the Veda, marriage is a union between a masculine and feminine entity with commitments to pursue Dharma (duty), Artha (earning money and other possessions), Kama (physical and other desires) and Moksha (the eternal liberation) in unison. Scripturally, it is viewed as a celebration of sensual pleasure, progress, prosperity and joy as it is also a pyramid of elevation to the next level of one's Karmic experience. Society recognizes this and puts in place quality controls since it influences the social and cultural growth of society. According to Manusmriti, or Manu's text, there are eight different types of marriages. Not all eight are approved by Scriptures. The last four were not advocated and the last one was condemned. These are: Brahma marriage, Daiva marriage, Arsha marriage, Prajapatya marriage, Gandharva marriage, Asura marriage, Rakshasa marriage, and Paishacha marriage.

=== Samskara ===
Cosmic rituals constitute an important part of Vedic practices/the Hindu religion. Rituals were designed to build a solid foundation for Dharmic living. They are known as Samskaras. Their purpose is to spread awareness and uplift social consciousness. The Veda has instituted sixteen different Samskara meant for different phases of life from conception to marriage to old age and death. The word samskara in Sanskrit means 'to cause indelible impressions on consciousness and to develop every aspect of oneself.' Out of the sixteen Samskaras in The Scripture, and consequently in Hinduism, the sacred practice of marriage or Vivaha Samskara is the most important and marks a milestone in journey of life. Vivaha Samskara influences the life of a couple as partners by enabling them to take their rightful place as creators in society.

== Key rituals ==
There is no single standard Hindu marriage ceremony. Regional variation is prevalent in the sequence of rituals comprising the ceremony. There is also considerable flexibility within each ritual. Variation reflects family traditions, local traditions, resources of the families and other factors. Three key rituals predominate, as follows. Two are yajna.

- Kanyadana – the giving away of his daughter by the father.
- Panigrahana – a ritual in presence of fire, where the groom takes the bride's hand as a sign of their union and a vow to care and protect her.
- Saptapadi – The term means 'seven steps'. It symbolizes the journey of life they will take together. Each step corresponds (in the Long Form) to a pair of vows: from the groom to the bride, and vice-versa. The vows are pronounced in Sanskrit; sometimes also in the native or regional language of the couple. (For the Short Form see below.) Like Panigrahana, Saptapadi is performed in presence of fire, and in many weddings, after each of their seven oaths to each other, the groom and bride perform the ritual of agnipradakshinam: walking around the fire, with hands linked or with the ends of their garments tied together. The groom usually leads the bride in the walk for first few Pheras —circumambulatem around the consecrated fire, then the bride leads the groom in the rest. Fire is the divine witness (to the marriage), and after Saptapadi the couple are considered husband and wife.

=== Kanyadana ===
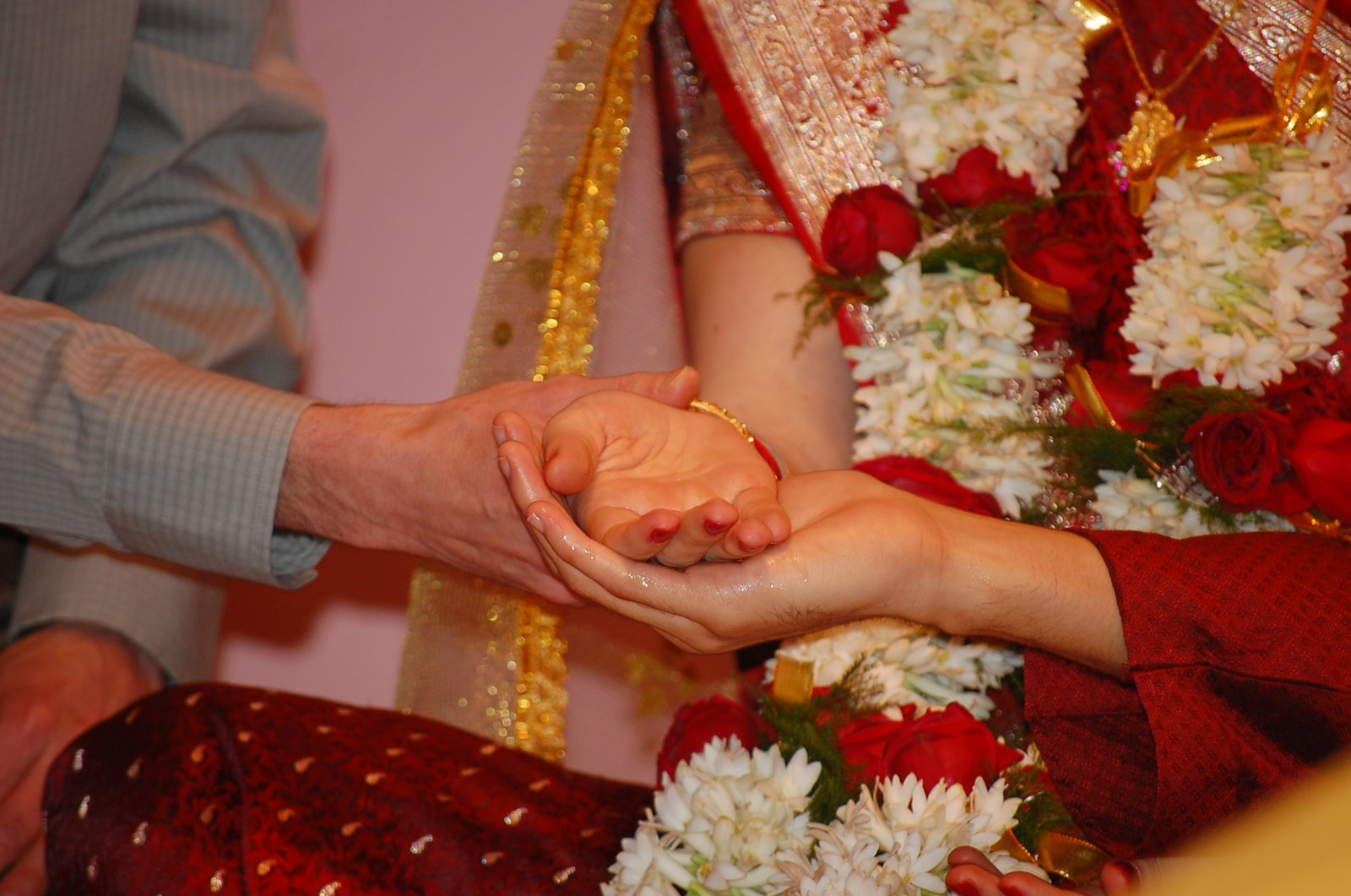
Kanyadana – a key ritual where the father gifts away from the daughter to the groom. In this picture, the father's hand is on the left, the bride and groom are on the right.

The Kanyadana ceremony is performed by the bride's father. If the father has died, a guardian of the bride's choosing performs the ritual. The father brings the daughter, then takes the bride's hand and places it in the groom's. This marks the beginning of the ceremony of giving away the bride. The groom accepts the bride's hand, while the kama-sukta (hymn to love) is pronounced, in the presence of the father, the bride and the groom. The Kamasukta verse is:

Who offered this maiden? to whom is she offered?
Kama (the god of love) gave her to me, that I may love her
Love is the giver, love is the acceptor
Enter thou, the bride, the ocean of love

With love then, I receive thee
May she remain thine, thine own, O God of love
Verily, thou art, prosperity itself
May the heaven bestow thee, may the earth receive thee

After this ritual recital, the father asks the groom to not fail the bride in his pursuit of dharma (moral and lawful life), artha (wealth) and kama (love). The groom promises to the bride's father that he shall never fail her in his pursuit of dharma, artha and kama. The groom repeats the promise three times. As per several stone inscriptions that have been found from 15th century in the Vijayanagara empire, to fight the epidemic of bride price, a community group of Brahmins created a social legislation to adopt the marriage system of kanyadana for their community. It was mandated that no money should be paid or received during marriage and those who do not follow are liable for punishment by the King. The above inscriptions also reinforce that system of social legislations within community groups was widely in practice as against personal laws based on religious scriptures.

This repeated promise by the groom marks the end of the kanyadaan ritual in the Hindu wedding.

=== Panigrahana ===
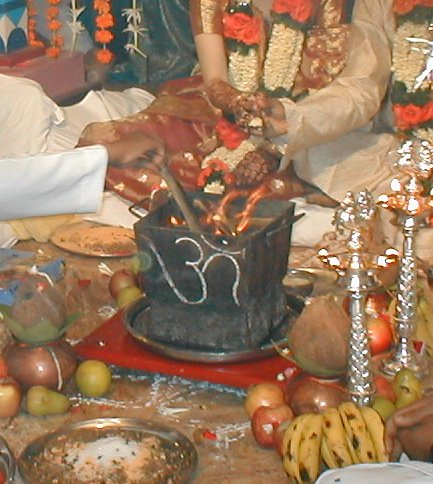
A yajna during a Hindu wedding

The ritual of Panigrahana comes after Kanyadana. It is sometimes preceded by the vivaha-homa rite, wherein a symbolic fire is lit by the groom to mark the start of a new household.

Panigrahana is the 'holding the hand' ritual as a symbol of the bride and groom's impending marital union, with the groom acknowledging a responsibility to four deities: Bhaga signifying wealth, Aryama signifying heavens/milky way, Savita signifying radiance/new beginning, and Purandhi signifying wisdom. The groom faces west, and while the bride sits in front of him, with her face to the east, he holds her hand while the following Rig vedic mantra is recited:

I take thy hand in mine, yearning for happiness
I ask thee, to live with me, as thy husband
Till both of us, with age, grow old

Know this, as I declare, that the Gods
Bhaga, Aryama, Savita and Purandhi, have bestowed thy person, upon me
that I may fulfill, my Dharmas of the householder, with thee

This I am, That art thou
The Sāman I, the Ŗc thou
The Heavens I, the Earth thou

In Punjabi and Gujarati weddings this step is called Hast-Milan (literally, "meeting of hands"). The whole ceremony was timed around an auspicious time (Muhurat) for this step and a few decades ago the wedding invitation would even list the time when this event was going to take place.

=== Saptapadi – short form ===
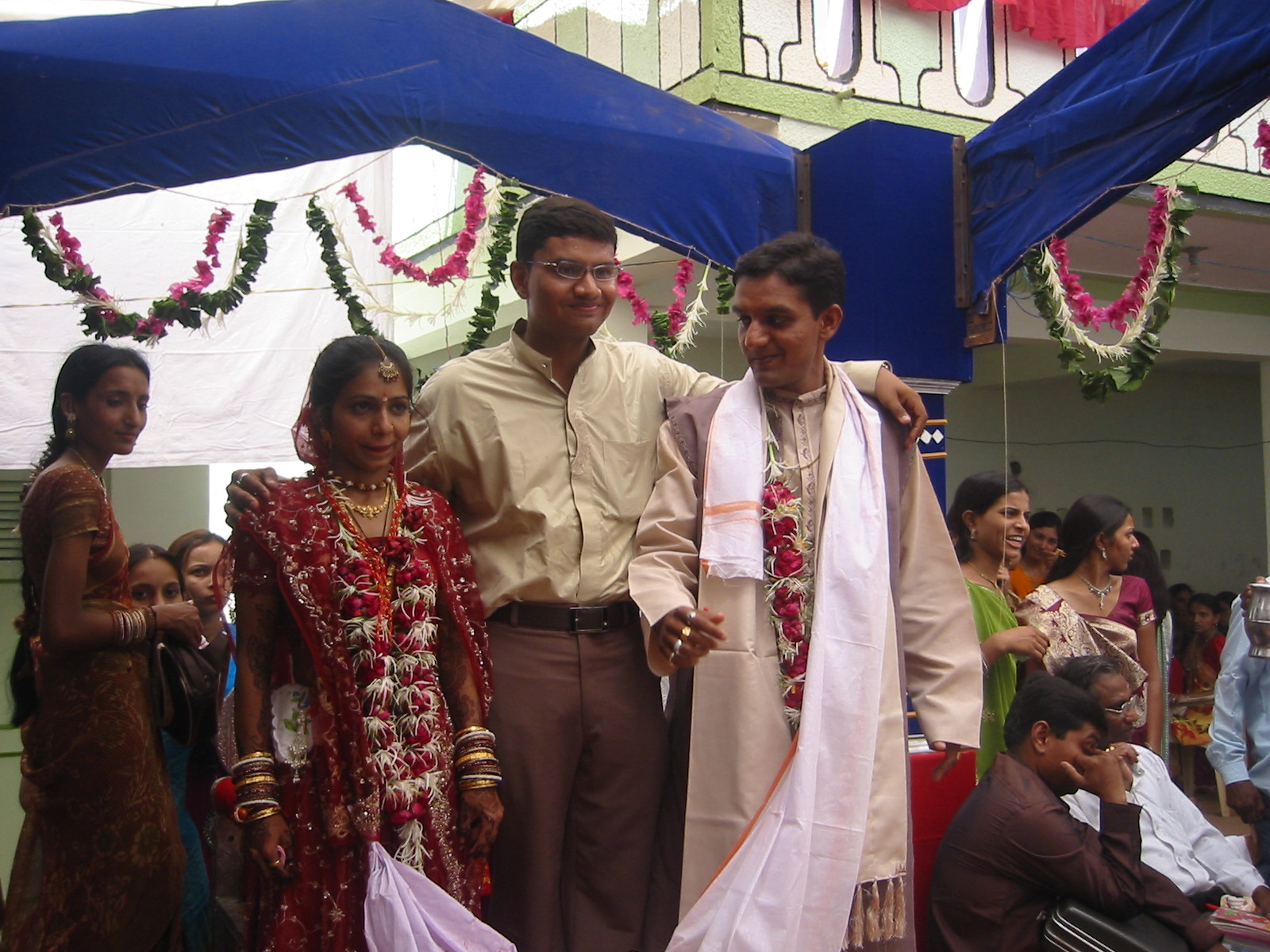
A Gujarati Hindu couple in post-marriage ceremonies, after Saptapadi. The tied clothing, represents lifelong bond formed during the seven promises ritual with fire as witness.

The Saptapadi (Sanskrit "seven steps"/"seven feet"; sometimes called Saat Phere: "seven rounds") is the main ritual of Vedic Hindu weddings, and represents the legal element of the Hindu marriage ceremony. The couple conduct seven circuits of the Holy Fire (Agni), which is considered a witness to the vows they make to each other. In some regions, a piece of clothing or sashes worn by the bride and groom are tied together for this ritual. Elsewhere, the groom holds the bride's right hand in his own right hand. Each circuit of the consecrated fire is led by either the bride or the groom, varying by community and region. Usually, the bride leads the groom in the first circuit. In North India, the first six circuits are led by the bride, and the final one by the groom. In Central India and Suriname, the bride leads the first three or four circuits. With each circuit, the couple makes a specific vow to establish some aspect of a happy relationship and household for each other.

In some South Indian weddings, after each saying a mantra at each of the seven steps, the couple say these words together:

"Now let us make a vow together. We shall share love, share the same food, share our strengths, share the same tastes. We shall be of one mind, we shall observe the vows together. I shall be the Samaveda, you the Rigveda, I shall be the Upper World, you the Earth; I shall be the Sukhilam, you the Holder – together we shall live and beget children, and other riches; come thou, O beautiful maiden!"

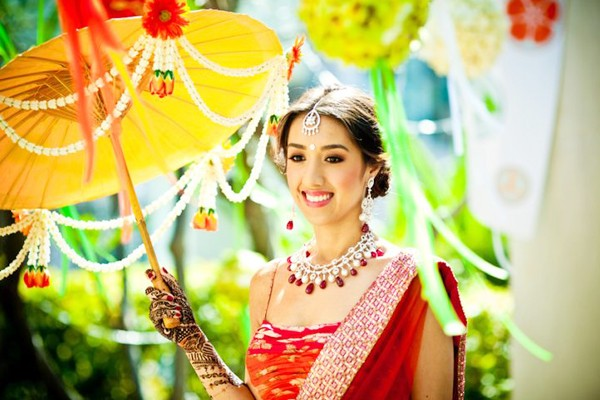
An Indian girl holding an umbrella for a Hindu wedding

In North Indian weddings, the bride and the groom say the following words after completing the seven steps:

We have taken the Seven Steps. You have become mine forever. Yes, we have become partners. I have become yours. Hereafter, I cannot live without you. Do not live without me. Let us share the joys. We are word and meaning, united. You are thought and I am sound. May the night be honey-sweet for us. May the morning be honey-sweet for us. May the earth be honey-sweet for us. May the heavens be honey-sweet for us. May the plants be honey-sweet for us. May the sun be all honey for us. May the cows yield us honey-sweet milk. As the heavens are stable, as the earth is stable, as the mountains are stable, as the whole universe is stable, so may our union be permanently settled.

=== Saptapadi – long form ===
The long form of Saptapadi starts with a preface announced by the priest, introducing a series of vows the groom and bride make to each other, as follows. With the completion of the seventh step the two become husband and wife.

Priest's preface

The world of men and women, united in the bond of marriage by Saptapadi, to further promote the joy of life, together listen with triumph.

Step 1

Groom's vow: Oh!, you who feeds life-sustaining food, nourish my visitors, friends, parents and offsprings with food and drinks. Oh! beautiful lady, I, as a form of Vishnu, take this first step with you for food.
Bride's vow: Yes, whatever food you earn with hard work, I will safeguard it, prepare it to nourish you. I promise to respect your wishes, and nourish your friends and family as well.

Step 2

Groom's vow: Oh!, thoughtful and beautiful lady, with a well managed home, with purity of behavior and thought, you will enable us to be strong, energetic and happy. Oh! beautiful lady, I, as Vishnu, take this second step with you for the strength of body, character and being.
Bride's vow: Yes, I will manage the home according to my ability and reason. Together, I promise, to keep a home that is healthy, strength and energy giving.

Step 3

Groom's vow: Oh!, skillful and beautiful lady, I promise to devote myself to earning a livelihood by fair means, to discuss, and let you manage and preserve our wealth. Oh! dear lady, I, as Vishnu form, cover this third step with you to thus prosper in our wealth.
Bride's vow: Yes, I join you in managing our income and expenses. I promise to seek your consent, as I manage our wealth, fairly earned, so it grows and sustains our family.

Step 4

Groom's vow: Oh!, dear lady, I promise to trust your decisions about the household and your choices; I promise to dedicate myself to help our community prosper, the matters outside the house. This shall bring us respect. Oh! my lady, I, as Vishnu, take this fourth step with you to participate in our world.
Bride's vow: Yes, I promise to strive to make the best home for us, anticipate and provide necessary things for your worldly life, and for the happiness of our family.

Step 5

Groom's vow: Oh!, lady of skill and pure thoughts, I promise to consult with you and engage you in the keep of our cows, our agriculture and our source of income; I promise to contribute to our country. It shall win us future. Oh! my skilled lady, I, as Vishnu form, take this fifth step with you to together grow our farms and cattle.
Bride's vow: Yes, I promise to participate and protect the cattle, our agriculture and business. They are a source of yoghurt, milk, ghee, and income, all useful for our family, necessary for our happiness.

Step 6

Groom's vow: Oh!, lovely lady, I seek you and only you, to love, to have children, to raise a family, to experience all the seasons of life. Oh! my lovely lady, I, as Vishnu, take this sixth step with you to experience every season of life.
Bride's vow: Feeling one with you, with your consent, I will be the means of your enjoyment of all the senses. Through life's seasons, I will cherish you in my heart. I will worship you and seek to complete you.

Step 7

Groom's vow: Oh friends!, allow us to cover the seventh step together, this promise, our Saptapad-friendship. Please be my constant wife.
Bride's vow: Yes, today, I gained you, I secured the highest kind of friendship with you. I will remember the vows we just took and adore you forever sincerely with all my heart.

=== Vakdaanam ===
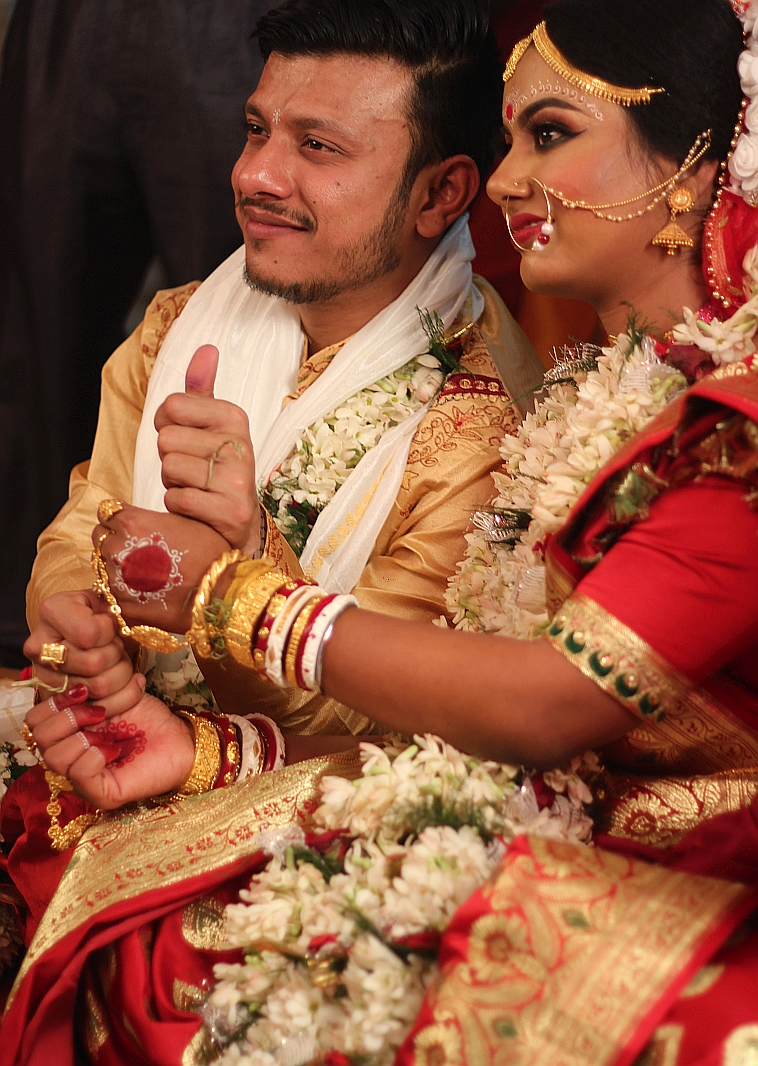
A Bengali Hindu wedding.

This step is a part of Kanya Varanam, where the groom-to-be (brahmachari) sends two elders on his behalf to the father of a girl whom he wishes to marry. The elders convey the message of the brahmachari and ask for the daughter's hand. The two mantras in the form of brahmachari's appeal to intercede on his behalf come from Rg 10.32.1 ("pra sugmantha...") and 10.85.23. The first mantra begs the elders to proceed and return quickly with success back from their mission on his behalf. The second mantram ("anruksharaa Rjava:...") asks for the gods' blessings for the elders' safe journey to the house of the father of the would-be-bride. The mantra prays to Aryama and Bhaga for a marriage full of harmony. The father accedes to the request of the elders and the resulting agreement for betrothal (formal engagement to be married; engagement.)is known as vaak daanam.

=== Vara Prekshanam ===
In this ritual, the bridegroom and the bride look at each other formally for the first time. The bridegroom worries about any doshas (defects) that the bride might have and prays to the gods Varuna, Brihaspati, Indra and Surya to remove every defect and to make her fit for harmonious and long marriage life blessed with progeny and happiness (mantra: Rg 10.85.44). The bride groom recites the mantra and wipes the eyebrows of the bride with a blade of darbha grass, to symbolize the removal of defects. The darbha grass is thrown behind the bride at the conclusion of this ceremony. The Bridegroom shall stand facing the east. The Bride shall stand facing the north. The bride (offering the seat or Asana), shall address the bridegroom as follows:

The bride: AUM, The noble one may accept and take the seat.
The bridegroom: AUM, I am taking my seat. (ॐ प्रातिग्रहनामी)

The bride shall take her seat to the right of the bridegroom. The bridegroom performs the Achamana and Angasparsha with water.

All Hindu religious ceremonies begin with two observances, namely Achaman or sipping a small quantity of water and angasparsha or touching one's limbs with one's right hand middle two fingers with a little water. Achaman is purificatory and conducive to peaceful attitude of mind. Angasparsha is intended to pray for physical strength and alertness. Achaman and Angasparsha are performed with the aid of Mantras.

=== Ardhāsana ceremony ===
This ritual originates from South India and places the groom and bride welcoming their respective families together to witness the exchange of testimonies accompanied with a simultaneous exchange of rings' or necklaces'. The groom and bride then sit next to each other making prayers to seek the blessings of Brahma, Vishnu, and Shiva for eternal happiness for themselves and their families.

==== Madhuparka ceremony ====
Holding with his left hand a cup of Madhuparka (composed of honey, curd and ghee or clarified butter), after removing the cover and looking at the Madhuparka,

The bridegroom says:

May the breeze be sweet as honey; may the streams flow full of honey and may the herbs and plants be laden with honey for us!

May the nights be honey-sweet for us; may the mornings be honey-sweet for us and may the heavens be honey-sweet for us!

May the plants be honey-sweet for us; may the sun be all honey for us and may the cows yield us honey-sweet milk!

"Honey-sweet", in this case, means pleasant, advantageous, and conducive to happiness. The bridegroom shall pour out the Madhuparka into three cups and then partake a little of it from each of the cups reciting the following Mantra:

The bridegroom: The honey is the sweetest and the best. May I have food as sweet and health-giving as this honey and may I be able to relish it!

==== Presentation of a ceremonial cow ====
The bride's father symbolically offers to the bridegroom a cow as a present. The cow is regarded as a symbol of the deity Kamadhenu. In olden times sons-in-law received real cows as gifts, since that was the most precious asset with which a newly wedded couple could start life. This part of the tradition has been preserved by a symbolical presentation. At the conclusion of the first part of the ceremony, it is customary to present gifts to the bride. The bridegroom presents the bride with gifts of clothing and jewellery thereby acknowledging his lifelong duty to provide her with the necessities of life.

The father of the bride, offering to the bridegroom the present of a cow, a finger-ring or some other suitable article says:

The father of the bride: AUM, (Please) accept these presents.
The bridegroom: AUM, I accept (these presents).

=== Mangalasnanam and the wearing of the wedding clothes by the bride ===
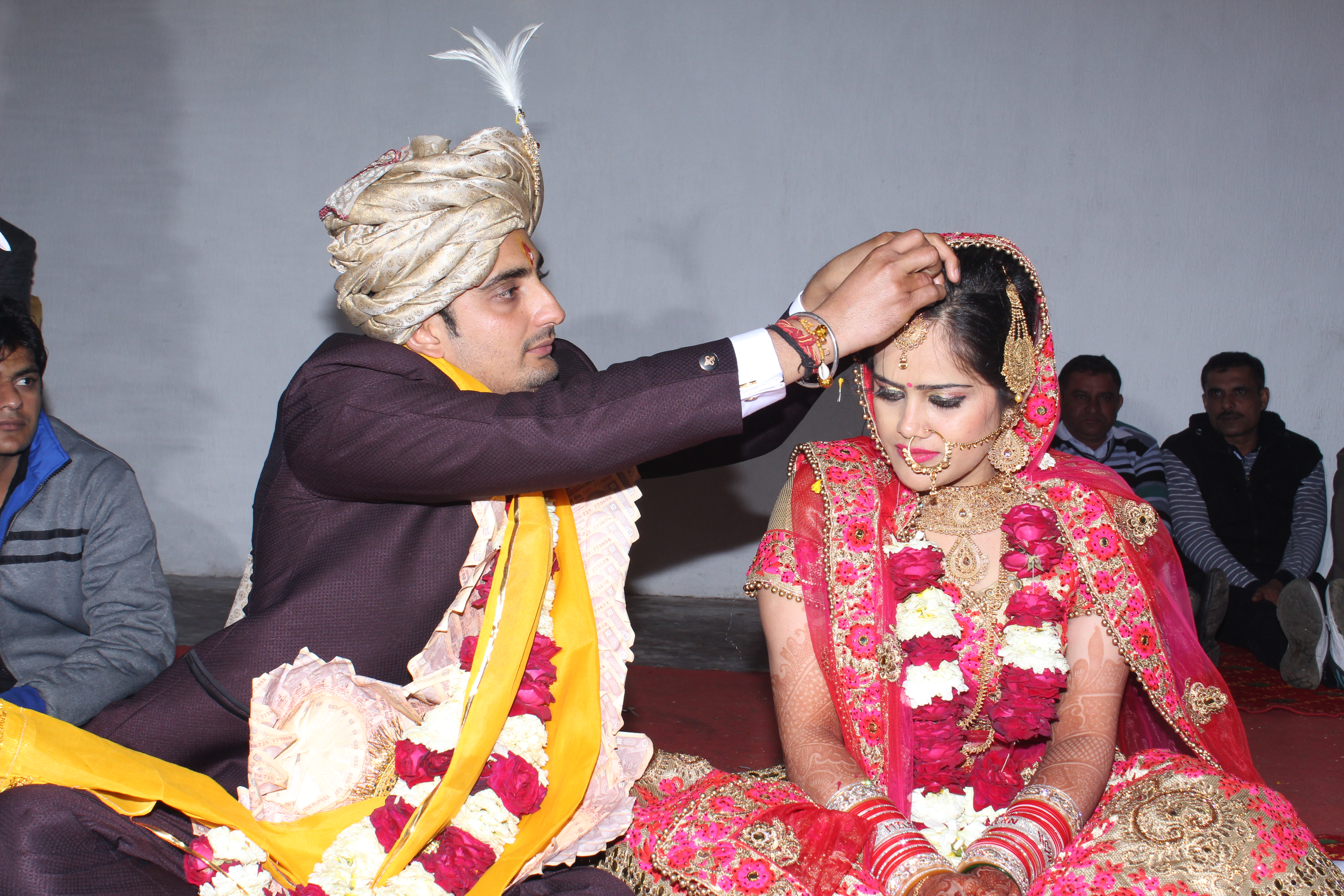
In Northern India, the groom puts sindoor on the bride's forehead and hair parting, to signify the marriage.

Five Veda mantras are recited to sanctify the bride in preparation for the subsequent stages of the marriage. This aspect of the marriage is known as mangalasnanam. The sun god (Surya), water god (Varuna), and other gods are invoked to purify the bride in preparation for a harmonious married life. Next, the bride wears the marriage clothes to the accompaniment of additional Veda mantras. The bridegroom then ties a darbha rope around the waist of the bride and leads her to the place, where the sacred fire is located for conducting the rest of the marriage ceremony. The bride and the groom sit on a new mat in front of the fire. The groom recites three mantras which invoke Soma, Gandharva and Agni to confer strength, beauty, and youth on the bride.

=== Mangalya Dharanam ===
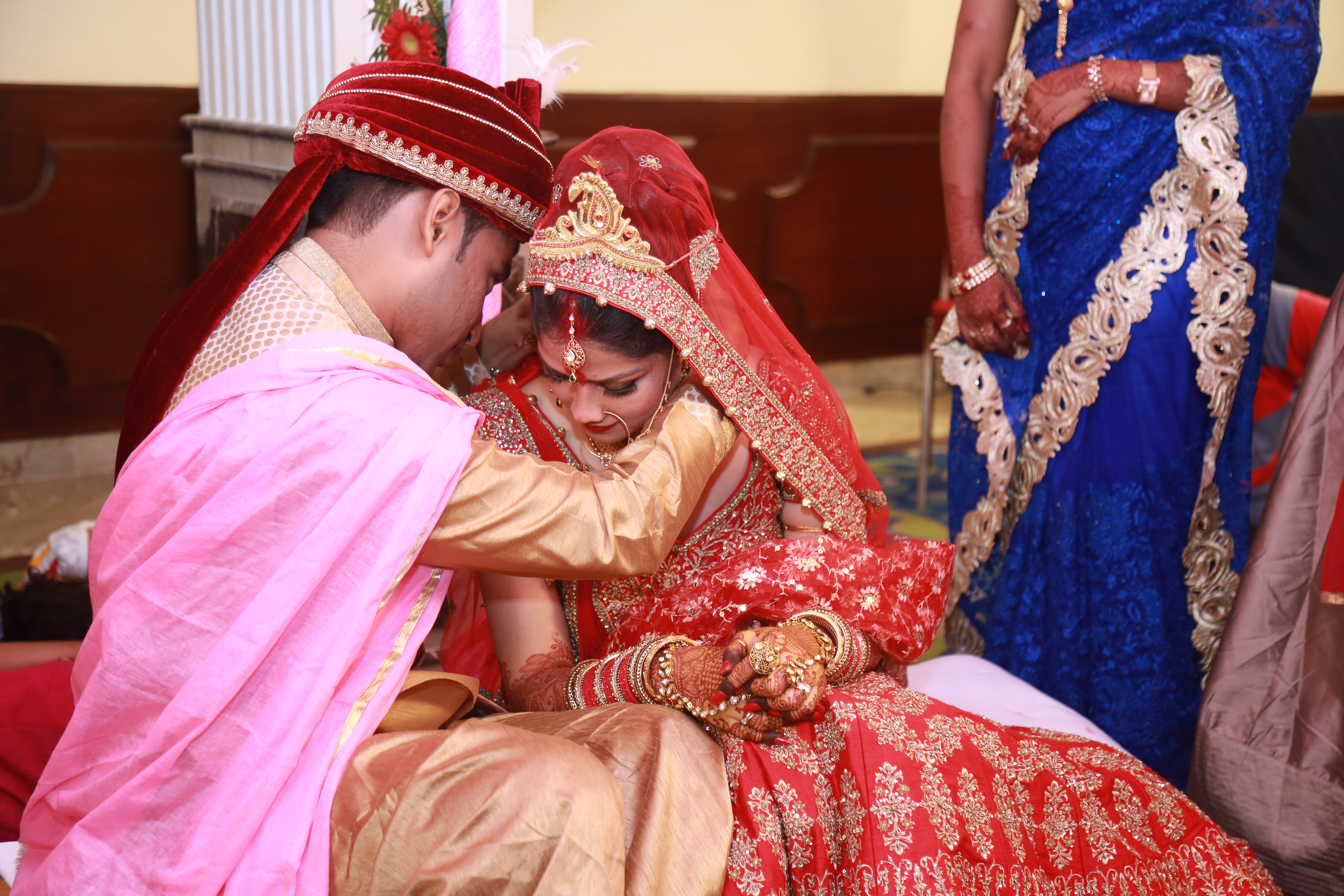
The groom tying the mangalasutra (marriage thread) around the bride's neck, to signify the marriage.

There is no Veda Mantram for tying the mangalasutram (auspicious thread) around the neck of the bride by the groom. The latter takes the mangala sutram in his hands and recites the following verse:

|| Maangalyam tantunaanena mama jeevana hetunaa:
kanThe bandhaami subhage twam jeeva saradaam satam ||
This is a sacred thread. This is essential for my long life. I tie this around your neck, O maiden having many auspicious attributes! May you live happily for a hundred years (with me).

As soon as the groom ties the knot, the family members, friends, and audience throw flower petals and rice grains, as a ceremonial gesture to bless the couple.

=== Pradhaana Homam or Jayadi Homamam ===
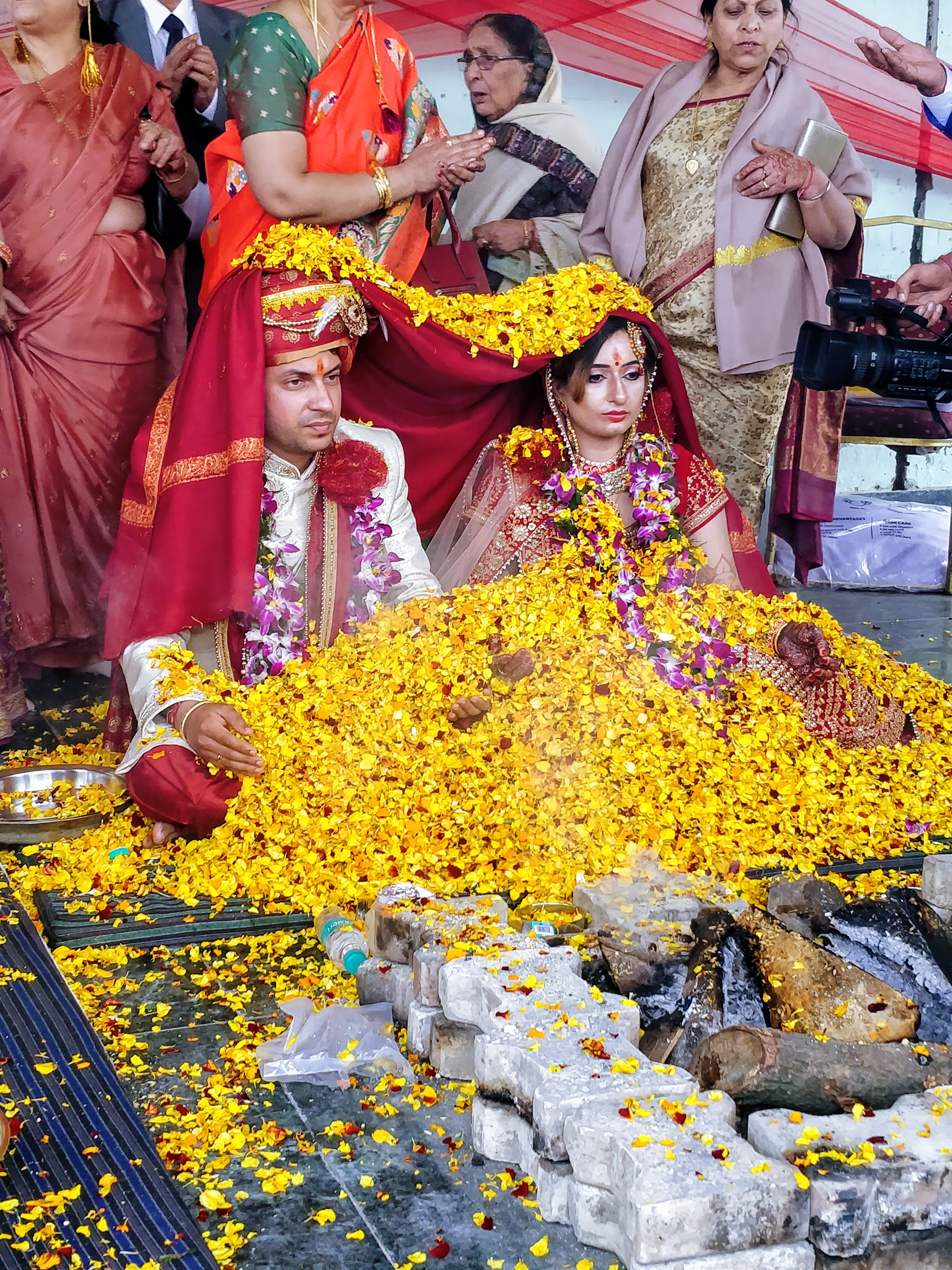
A Kashmiri bride & groom at their wedding, after the flowers are thrown at the couple during the mangalya dharanam (mangalasutra tying) ceremony.

After sapta padi, the couple take their seat on the western side of the sacred fire and conduct pradhaana homam. During the conductance of this homam, the bride must place her right hand on her husband's body so that she gets the full benefit of the homam through symbolic participation. Sixteen mantras are recited to the accompaniment of pouring a spoon of clarified butter into the sacred fire at the end of recitation of each of the mantras. These mantras salute Soma, Gandharva, Agni, Indra, Vayu, the Aswini Devas, Savita, Brihaspati, Viswa Devas and Varuna for blessing the marriage and beseeches them to confer long wedded life, health, wealth, children and freedom from all kinds of worries. One prayer—the sixth mantra—has a sense of humor and provides deep insight into human psychology. The text of this mantra is: "daSaasyam putraan dehi, patim ekaadaSam kRti". Here, the groom asks Indra to bless the couple with ten children and requests that he be blessed to become the eleventh child of his bride in his old age.

=== Ashmarohanam (stepping on the grinding stone) ===
After pradhaana homam, the husband holds the right toe of his wife and lifts her leg and places it on a flat granite grinding stone known as "ammi" in Tamil. The ammi stands at the right side of the sacred fire. The husband recites a Veda mantra when he places the right foot of his wife on the ammi: May you stand on this firm stone. May you be rock-firm during your stay on this grinding stone. May you stand up to those who oppose you while you carry out your time-honored responsibilities as a wife sanctioned by the Vedas and tradition. May you develop tolerance to your enemies and put up a fair fight to defend your legitimate rights as the head of the household in a firm manner, equal to the steady strength of this grinding stone. Some traditions mention to wear two silver ring on the either toes of bride by the bridegroom at this time.

=== Laaja Homam ===
After ammi stepping, a ceremony of doing homam with parched rice (laja) is conducted. Here, the wife cups her hands and the brothers of the bride fill the cupped hands with parched rice. The husband adds a drop of ghee to the parched rice and recites five Veda mantras. At the end of each of the recitation, the parched rice is thrown into the sacred fire as haves (offering) to Agni. Through these mantras, the wife prays for long life for her husband and for a marriage filled with peace and harmony. When the ceremony of the laaja homam is about to conclude, the husband unfastens the darbha belt tied to the waist of his wife using a mantra. It is through the mantra that the husband declares that he is uniting his wife and tying her now to the knots of Varuna and asks her to be his equal partner in life.

=== Griha Pravesam ===
This ceremony relates to the journey of the wife to her husband's home. The husband carries the sacred fire (home agni) in an earthenware vessel during this journey home. There are many Veda mantras associated with this journey. These mantras pray to the appropriate Vedic gods to remove all obstacles that one can experience in a journey. The bride is requested to become the mistress of the house and is reminded of her important role among the relatives of her husband. After reaching her new home, she puts her right foot first in the house and recites the following Veda mantra:

I enter this house with a happy heart. May I give birth to children, who observe the path of righteousness (dharma)! May this house that I enter today be prosperous forever and never be deficient in food. May this house be populated by people of virtue and pious thoughts.

=== Praavisya Homam ===
After griha pravesam, a fire ritual known as praavisya homam is performed by the couple to the accompaniment of thirteen Veda mantras from the Rg Veda. Jayaadi homam is also part of the praavisya homam. This homam offers the salutation of the newly married couple to Agni Deva and asks for strength and nourishment to discharge the duties of a grihasthas for the next one hundred years. After that, the bride shifts her position from the right side of her husband to his left side. At that time, once again, she recites a Veda mantra invoking the gods for blessings of children and wealth to perform the duties of a householder.

At the end of the above homam, a child is placed on the lap of the bride and she offers a fruit to the child, while reciting a prescribed Veda mantra. Yet another mantram asks the assembled guests to bless the bride and then retire to their own individual homes peacefully. During the first evening of the stay in her new home, the couple see the stars known as Dhruva (pole star) and Arundhati. The husband points out the pole star and prays for the strength and stability of the household through a Veda mantra. Next, the husband points out the Arundhati star to his wife and describes to her the story of Arundhati and her legendary chastity.

The Hindu marriage rituals (the Kalyana Mahotsavam performed in the temples) are conducted in conjunction with the sacred Veda Mantras. The bride and bridegroom speak and think about the significance of the Veda Mantras in the various rituals of marriage.This is done to ensure a successful married life. Srinivasa Kalyanam is performed in the temples to instruct about ancient Vedic customs of Hindu marriages.

lokA: samastA: sukhino bhavantu

sarva mangaLaani santu

=== Nishekam ===
Also called Suhaag Raat (wedding night), It is the samskara done before the couple enters their bedroom. Nishekam means the couple's first consummation. In South India they do Nishekam on a suitable date according to astrology or jyotisha. Whereas in North India and East India they do it on the fourth day of the marriage. Paraskara Grihya Sutram of Shukla Yajurveda mentions to conduct it on the fourth night in the prescribed room of the couple. It's otherwise called Chaturthi Karma.

== Rituals performed ==
According to V. Sadagopan, the rituals are as follows.

=== Kanyadana ===
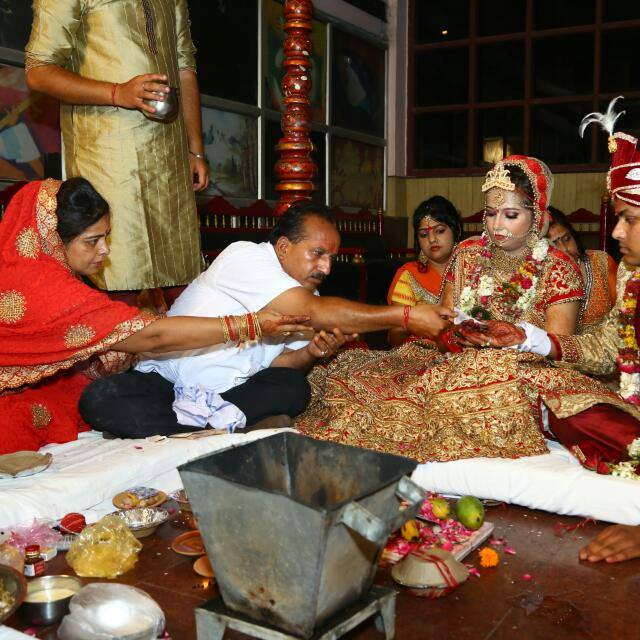
Kanyadana in a Hindu wedding.

The word 'kanyādana' is made of two parts, 'kanyā' meaning unmarried girl and 'dāna' which means 'charity'. The officiating priest chants appropriate verses in Sanskrit. The people in the audience (the public) are now notified that the parents have willingly expressed their wish and consent by requesting the groom to accept their daughter as his bride. As soon as the groom indicates his acceptance the bride's parents place their daughter's right hand into the bridegroom's right hand. The parents now bestow their blessings on both the bride and the groom and pray to the Lord to shower His choicest blessings on them.

The father of the bride, placing her right hand on the right hand of the bridegroom, says:

The father of the bride: Be pleased to accept hand of my daughter (name of the bride) of the Gotra (here the surname of the family).

The bridegroom: AUM, I do accept.

The bridegroom makes an Offering of the garment and the scarf to the bride to wear. The bridegroom wears the garments and the scarf offered by the parents of the bride. Then facing each other The bride and the bridegroom speak as follows:

Ye learned people assembled at this sacred ceremony know it for certain that we two hereby accept each other as companions for life and agree to live together most cordially as husband and wife. May the hearts of us both be blended and beat in unison. May we love each other like the very breath of our lives. As the all-pervading God sustains the universe, so may we sustain each other. As a preceptor loves his disciple, so may we love each other steadfastly and faithfully. - RigVeda X.85.47

Addressing the bride, the bridegroom says:

Distant though we were, one from the other, we stand now united. May we be of one mind and spirit! Through the grace of God, may the eyes radiate benevolence. Be thou my shield. May thou have a cheerful heart and a smiling face. May thou be a true devotee of God and mother of heroes. May thou have at heart the welfare of all living beings! - Rig Veda X.85.44

The bride:

I pray that henceforth I may follow thy path. May my body be free from disease and defect and may I ever enjoy the bliss of your companionship!

=== Vivaha Homa (sacred fire ritual) ===
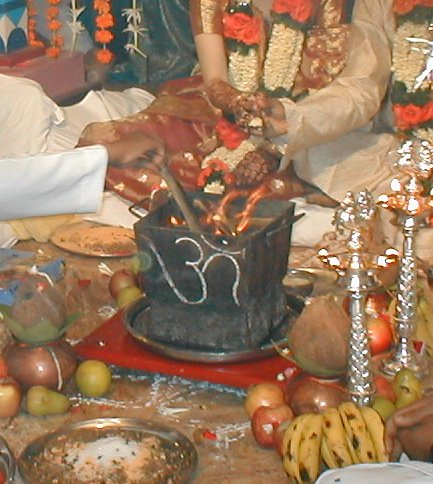
A yajna during a Hindu wedding

Vivaha-homa is also called the "sacred fire ceremony". All solemn rites and ceremonies commence with the performance of Homa (sacred fire ceremony) among the followers of Vedic religion. The idea is to begin all auspicious undertakings in an atmosphere of purity and spirituality. This atmosphere is created by the burning of fragrant herbs and ghee and by the recitation of suitable Mantras.

The Achaman and Angasparsha are performed for the second time. The bride also participates.

The three Achaman mantras involve sipping of a little water three times.

The seven Angasparsha mantras involve touching water with the right hand middle two fingers apply the water to various limbs first to the right side and then the left side as follows: Mouth, Nostrils, Eyes, Ears, Arms, Thighs, Sprinkling water all over the body. Vivah samskara is a marriage not only between two bodies but also between two souls.

=== Pani Grahanam (acceptance of the hand) ===
The bridegroom rising from his seat and facing the bride, shall raise her right hand with his left hand and then clasping it says:

I clasp thy hand and enter into the holy state of matrimony so that we may be blessed with prosperity and noble progeny. Mayst thou live with me happily throughout life! Through the grace of the all-mighty Lord, who is the Creator and Sustainer of the universe and in the presence of this august assemblage, thou art being given away in marriage so that we may together rightly perform our duties as householders.

With all my strength and resources, I have clasped thy hand; and thus united, we shall together follow the path of virtue. Thou art my lawfully wedded wife and I am thy lawfully wedded husband. God, the protector and sustainer of all, has given thee to me. From today, it devolves upon me to protect and maintain thee. Blessed with children, mayst thou live happily with me as thy husband for the full span of human life (a hundred years).

Following the divine law and the words of wisdom uttered by the sages, may we make a good couple and may God vouchsafe unto us a shining life of virtue and happiness.

As God nourishes and sustains all creatures through His great forces like the sun, the moon, the earth, the air etc., so may He bless my wife with healthy and virtuous progeny and may you all assembled here bless her!

- I accept thee as my partner for life.
- I will not keep away even mentally anything from thee.
- I will share with thee all I enjoy.
- We will persevere in the path of virtue, surmounting all obstacles.

=== Pratijñā Karana (solemn vows) ===
The bridegroom taking the palm of the bride into his hand helps her to rise and then they both shall walk round the altar, the bride leading. Then facing the east take the solemn vows:

=== Ashmarohanam or Shilarohanam (stepping on the stone) ===
This ceremony is referred to as Ashmarohanam or Shilarohanam (Ashma or Shila: stone; Arohan: stepping upon). In it, the mother of the bride assists her to step onto a stone and counsels her to prepare herself for a new life. The stone signifies strength and trust. A married couple is likely to encounter ups and downs, joys and sorrows, prosperity and adversity, sickness and health. In spite of the difficulties facing them, they are enjoined to remain steadfast and true to each other.

The bride places her right foot on the slab (stone), assisted by her mother or her brother. The priest recites a Mantra from the Atharva Veda (AV II.13.4)

=== Laja Homah (puffed-rice offerings) ===
Laja means parched rice or barley like popcorn. The bride shall place the palms of her hands over those of the bridegroom and make three offerings (ahutis) of parched rice soaked in ghee (clarified butter).

The bride:

- I adore God, the unifier of hearts. Now that I am leaving my parents' home for my husband's, I pray that He may keep us perpetually united!
- With these offerings I pray for Long life for my husband and for the prosperity of all our relations!
- (Addressing her husband) In making these offerings for your prosperity I once again pray that God may bless this union of our hearts!

A Bhojpuri song sung during the lawa (parched rice) wedding ritual

=== Agniparinayana, Parikrama, Pradakshina, or Mangal Phera (circumambulation of the sacred fire) ===
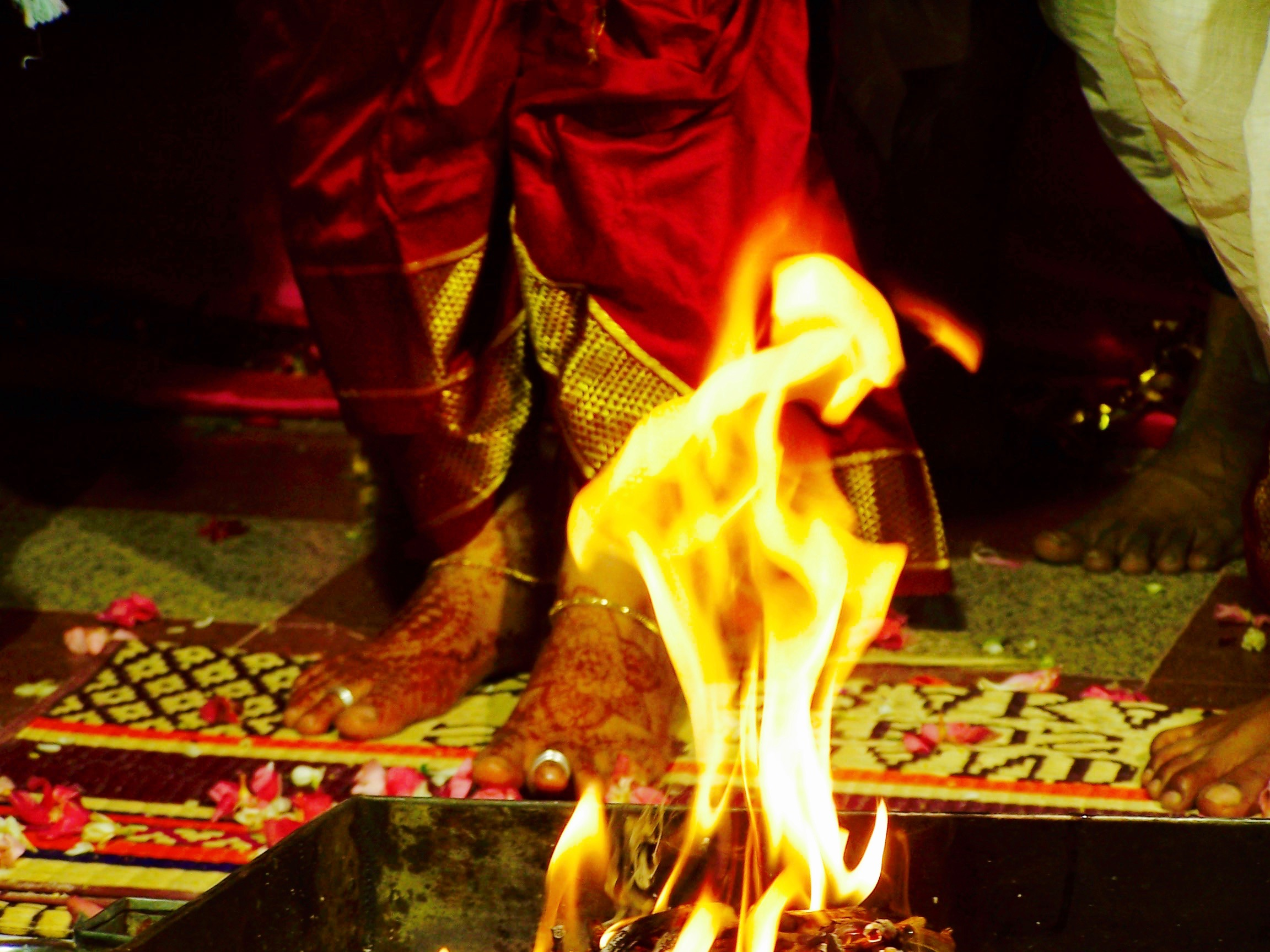
The Vedic fire ritual in a traditional Hindu wedding.

This is an auspicious and important part of the marriage ceremony. It consists in walking around the sacred fire (clockwise) three or four (less often five, but sometimes seven) times. This aspect of the ceremony and the one that follows, namely Saptapadi (seven steps) - constitute the main part, in as much as it legalises the marriage according to Hindu custom and tradition. These two aspects of the marriage ceremony establish an indissoluble matrimonial bond between the couple.

In many communities, the saptapadi and agniparinayana have been merged into one ritual; and hence they circumambulate the fire seven times (saat phere).

In the first three rounds the bride leads the Groom as they circle together around the sacred fire. From the fourth round, the Groom leads the bride around the sacred fire.

In each round around the sacred fire, an appropriate mantra is recited which expresses noble sentiments in relation to their future matrimonial life. Each round culminates in both the bride and the bridegroom placing offerings or ahutis of fried rice in the sacred fire. The Hindu religion emphasises enjoyment of life as well as the discharging of family, social and national responsibilities.

During the first three rounds, God's blessings and help are sought, loyalty to each other is emphasised and a promise to keep in mind the well-being and care of the future children is made.

In the last four rounds (led by the Groom) they promise that they will lead their life according to the tenets of the Hindu religion, namely Satya and Dharma or Truth and devotion to duty; that they will always ensure that the bridegroom can rely on her to carry out her family, religious and household duties; that they will always support each other in all their endeavours; and that they forever belong to each other and will remain friends forever.

The bridegroom then places his hand on the bride's head and states that henceforth she will be his wife and he will shield her against any danger or harm.

At the end of the four rounds they shall exchange seats, the bride accepting her seat to the left of the bridegroom (vaamaang).

=== Saptapadi (seven steps) ===
The ends of their garments (the bridegroom's scarf and upper garment of the bride) are tied together by the priest (signifying marriage knot). Then both shall stand facing the north. The bridegroom shall place his right hand upon the right shoulder of the bride.

They shall take the first step in the north easterly direction.

In taking these seven steps, the right foot shall always lead and the left foot be brought forward in line with it. Uncooked grains of rice (about a small handful) are placed in a line at equal distance at seven places. The bride and the groom take seven steps together, stepping upon first mound of rice with the right foot as the priest recites a mantra. Then stepping upon the second mount of rice with the right foot as the priest recites a mantra. (All seven steps are done the same way).

- May the first step lead to food that is both nourishing and pure.
- May the second step lead to strength (at the physical, emotional, intellectual and spiritual levels).
- May the third step lead to prosperity.
- May the fourth step lead to all round happiness.
- May the fifth step lead to progeny (noble and virtuous children).
- May the sixth step lead to long life.
- May the seventh step lead to bondage (through harmony).

The bridegroom says:

Having completed the seven steps, be thou my lifelong companion. Mayst thou be my associate and helper in successful performance of the duties that now devolve upon me as a householder. May we be blessed with many children who may live the full duration of human life!

After the completion of the seven steps ceremony, the couple (with knots tied to each other) take their seats. The wife now takes her rightful place on the left side of her husband as the marriage is now religiously solemnized in its entirety. Now the couple are husband and wife. The husband garlands the wife and she in turn garlands her husband.

=== Abhishekam (sprinkling of water) ===
The priest (or a brother of the newly wedded wife) shall sprinkle water on the foreheads of the bride and the groom. The priest recites mantras from the Rig Veda (RV X.9.1/2/3) during the sprinkling of water.

=== Surya Darshanam Dhyaanam Va (meditating on the sun) ===
Looking at or mentally visualising the sun (Surya), to give them power to lead a creative, useful and meaningful life.

The bride and the bridegroom together pray:

O God, who art the illuminator of the sun, may we, through thy grace live for a hundred years, hear for a hundred years, and speak for a hundred years. And may we never be dependent upon anybody. May we likewise live even beyond a hundred years! -Rig Veda, VII. 66. 16)

=== Hṛdaya sparsham (touching the heart) ===
Touching the heart of the bride, the bridegroom says:

May I have hearty co-operation from these in the performance of my duties. May thou be of one mind with me. May thou be consentient to my speech. May the Lord of creation unite thee to me!

The bride:

May I have hearty co-operation from these in the performance of my duties. May thou be of one mind with me. May thou be consentient to my speech. May the Lord of creation unite thee to me!

=== Dhruva Dhyaanam Darshanam Va (meditating on the Pole star and the Arundhati star) ===
The Pole Star is associated with steadfastness. In this ritual, the couple is encouraged to remain steadfast in fulfilling their responsibilities towards each other.

The bride:

Just as the star Arundhati is attached to the star Vasishtha, so may I be ever firmly attached to my husband! Placing his hand upon the bride's forehead

The bridegroom:

As the heavens are permanently stable, as the earth is permanently stable, as these mountains are permanently stable, and as the entire universe is permanent stable, so may my wife be permanently settled in our family! -Rig Veda X.173.4

(Addressing the bride): Thou are the Pole star; I see in thee stability and firmness. Mayst thou ever be steadfast in thy affection for me. The great God has united thee with me. Mayst thou live with me, blessed with children, for a hundred years!

=== Anna Praashanam (partaking of food) ===
In the last symbolic rite the couple make offerings of food with chantings of Vedic Havan Mantras (oblations of food in the Sacred fire). Having done that, the couple feed a morsel of food to each other from the residue of the offerings. This being the symbolic expression of mutual love and affection.

=== Aashirvadah (blessing) ===
Placing his hand upon the forehead of the bride, the bridegroom says:

Ye men and women present here, behold this virtuous bride possessed of high attainments, and before ye disperse, give her your blessings! All the people present shall pronounce the following blessings upon the couple.

1. O Lord, may this couple be prosperous!
2. O Lord, may this couple live in perpetual happiness!
3. O Lord, may this couple be ever infused with love for each other. May this couple be blessed with children and grandchildren and live in the best of homes for the full period of their lives!
4. May you two live here together. May you never be parted. May you enjoy the full span of human life in the delightful company of your happy sons and grandsons!

Om Shantih, Shantih, Shantih.

== Rituals by region ==
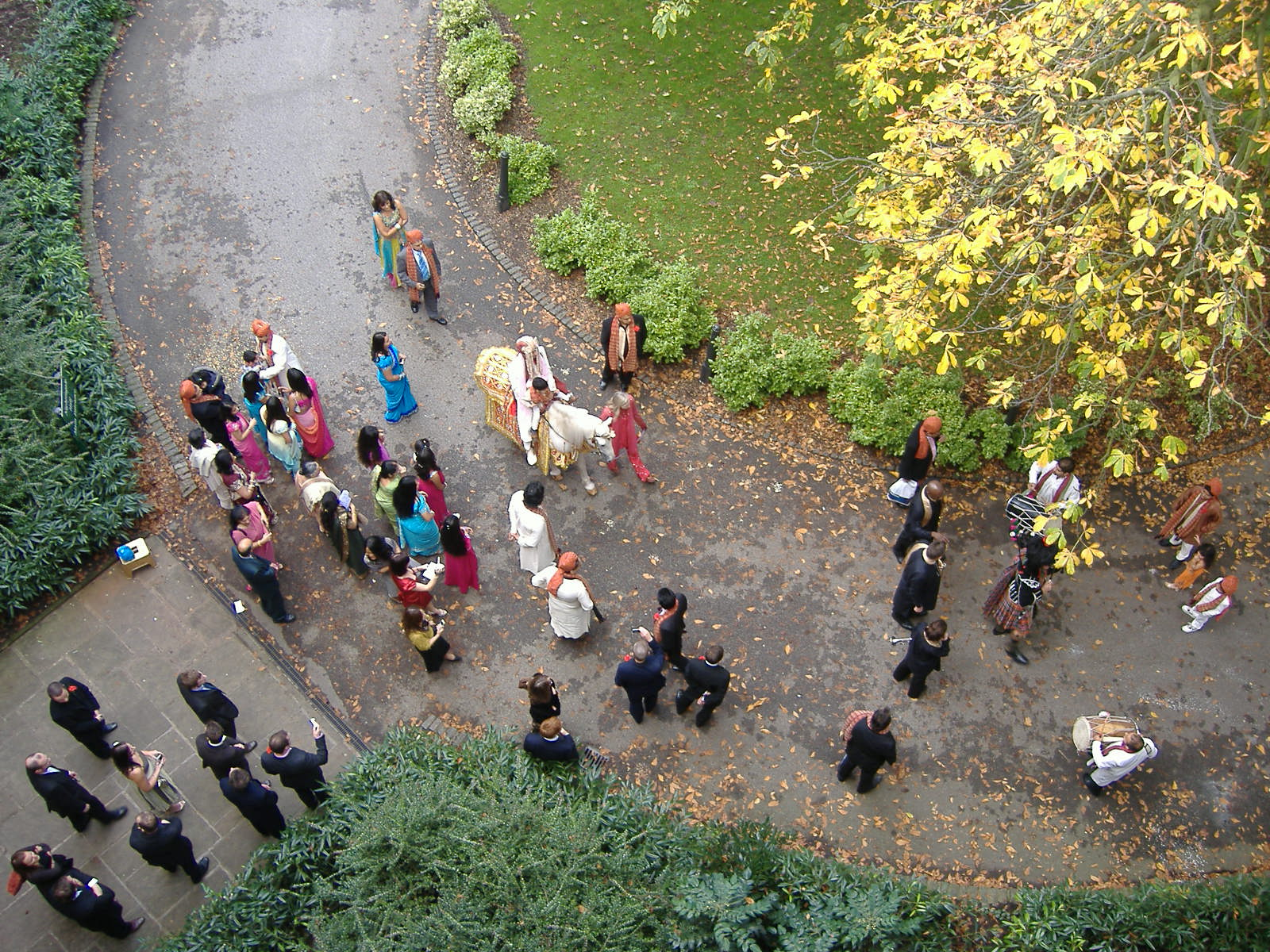
Some Indian Hindu weddings abroad symbolically maintain some of the customs in India. Above is a symbolic arrival of the groom on a horse (baraat), in Nottingham, England. In front is the band.

Many Hindu weddings start with the milne (meeting) and swagatam (welcome) ceremony. This ritual is where the baraat (groom's procession party) arrives at the bride's home or the location where the bride is and marriage will be celebrated. The baraat typically includes dancing and joyous members of groom's family, relatives and friends. On their arrival, there is a ritual where key persons from the groom's side and bride's side are introduced to each other. The introduction is typically followed by jai mala (garland exchange between bride and groom) and a reception that serves food and drinks.

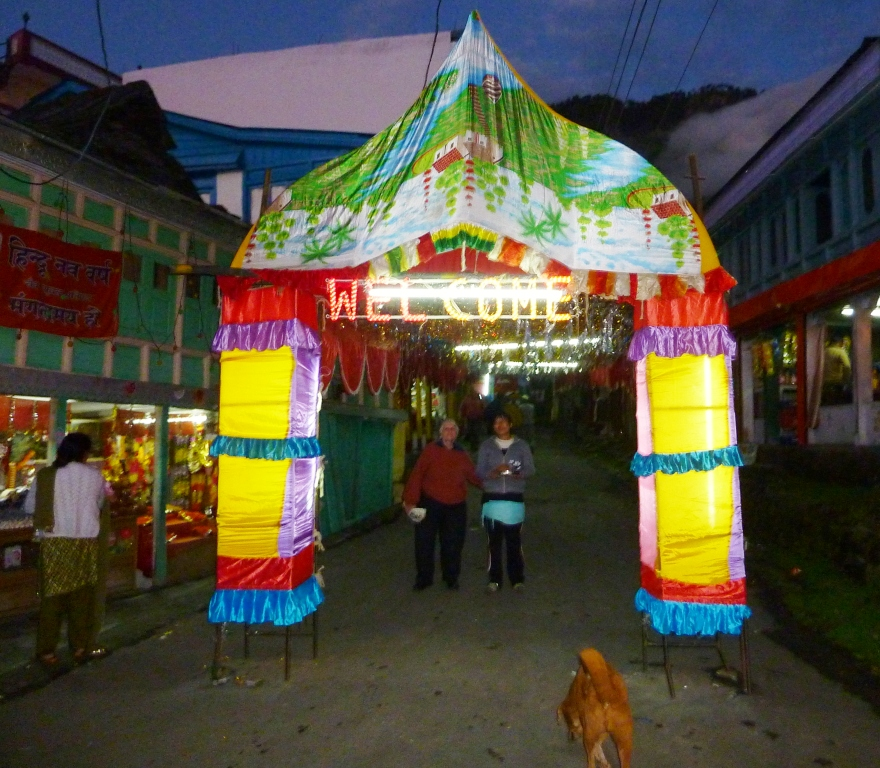
Decorated entrance to wedding festivities. Sarahan, India

Many other rituals and ceremonies are sometimes found in Hindu weddings, such as madhuparka, vivaah-homa, agni-parinayana, asmarohana, laja homa, abhishek, anna-prashashan, and aashir-vadah. All these ceremonies are carried out at the wedding location, typically at or near the bride's home. These additional rituals include the participation of the brothers, sisters, maternal/paternal relatives, guardians, or friends of the bride.

In some parts of India, such as Gujarat and Northern India, a laja homa ritual called mangal pherā is performed where the couple make four circles around holy fire. It follows hasta milap (meeting of hands of the couple), but precedes saptapadi. The first three circles is led by the groom, and it represents three of four goals of life considered important in Hindu life – Dharma, Artha, Kama. The fourth circle is led by bride and it represents the fourth goal of life – Moksha. After saptapadi, as hymns are being recited, the groom performs māņg sindoor ritual where a saffron or red color powder is marked into the parting of the wife's hair. Instead of circling the fire and other steps, the rituals and ceremonies may be performed symbolically, such as stepping on small heaps of rice or throwing grains into the fire.

Some rituals involve rice or other grains, seeds and pastes. In these ceremonies, rice is thrown at the bride, groom or they kick a container containing the grain. Rituals include darshan, where the newly married couple are met, blessed and greeted by family and friends of the bride and groom.

After the Hindu wedding is complete, the bride leaves for groom's home via groom's car. In groom's car, bride and groom sit together, and groom's younger brother drives the car. Bride's sisters also come with groom's family, when they arrive to groom house where Hindu family members of the groom welcome the newly wedded couple in a ritual known as grihapravesa (home coming/entry). This ceremony typically requires participation of the mother, father, brothers, and sisters, or other guardians of the groom.

Ancient literature suggests the Hindu couple spent time with each other, but delayed the consummation for at least three nights following the wedding. Some scholars have proposed the observance of this rite in the past – known as chaturthikarma – "the rite performed on the fourth day of marriage". Chaturthikarma is followed by most of South Indian communities as a possible basis for the validity of a marriage. Other scholars suggest saptapadi and regionally customary wedding rituals, not consummation, defines legal validity of a Hindu marriage. The Hindu Marriage Act of 1955, Article 7, is consistent with the latter. Chaturthikarma is not a common practice in Hindu communities.

In modern Hindu families, the couple proceed to honeymoon after grihapravesa.

=== Rituals in Rajasthan ===
It comprises a ceremony for the Tilak (engagement), the Ban (starting of the wedding), the Mel (the community feast), the Nikasi (the departure of the Bridegroom party for the wedding), the Sehla, and the Dhukav (reception of the wedding party at the bride's place by her parents). Solemnisation of the wedding is referred to as Fera.

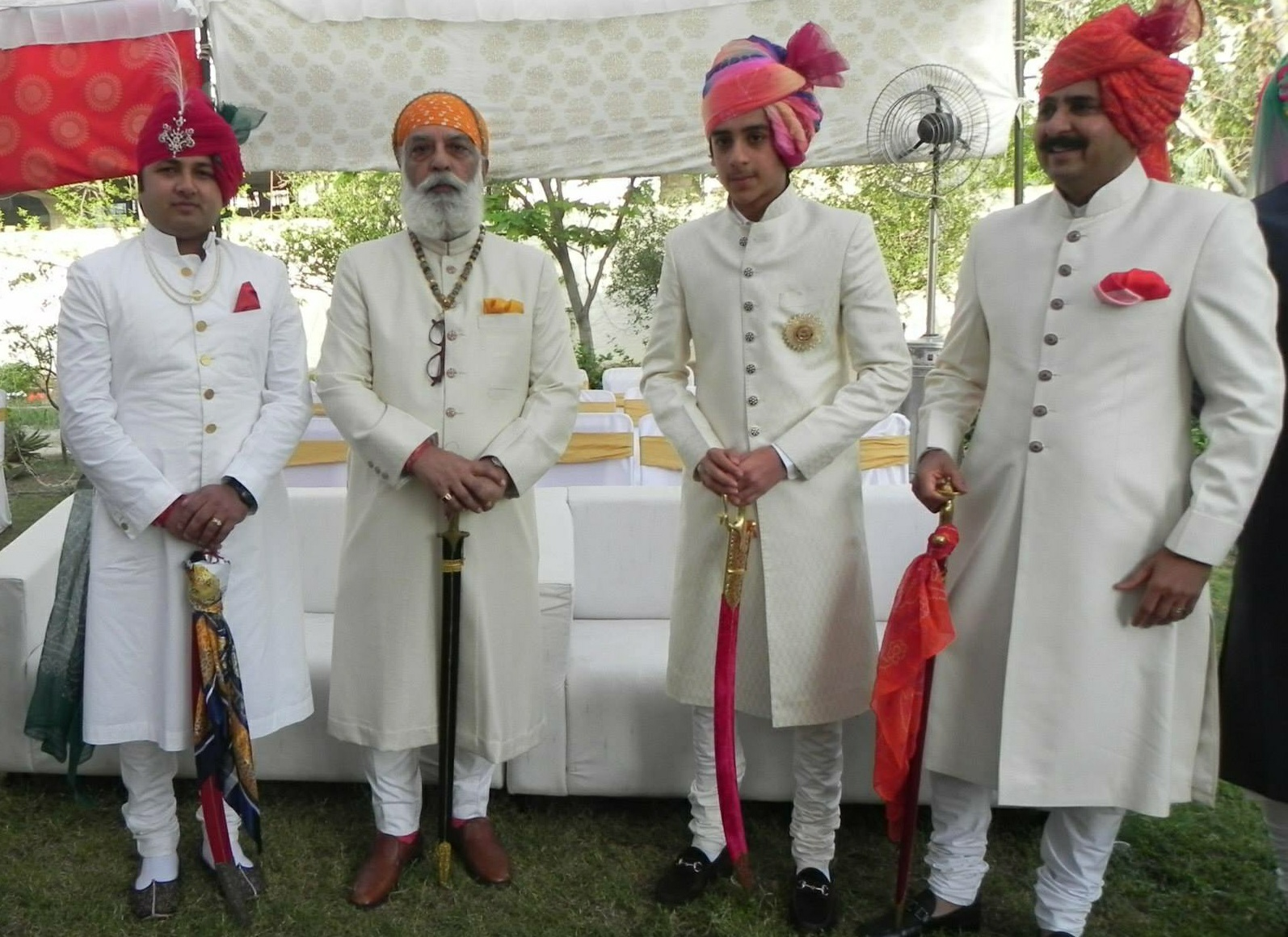
Achkan sherwani worn by Arvind Singh Mewar, Maharana of Udaipur, Mewar with some other Maharajas during a Rajput wedding in Rajasthan, India.

A sherwani also known as Achkan is normally worn by the bridegroom along with his own family form of a turban. He keeps a sword in his left hand during the ceremony. A bride wears a Lahanga, Odhani, Kurti or Poshak. The ornaments worn by a Rajput Bride are the Rakhdi on her forehead, the Sheesphul as headgear, the aad as a thick neck hanging, the Baju above her elbow (on arms), the "poonchis" and "bangdis" as thick golden bangles in arms, "hathfools" on hands and the Pajeb as anklets.

The wedding dress and the "aad" is gifted by the groom's side to the bride. The barat at the time of "samela" presents them in the "padla" (a collection of many lahanga, jewelry items, accessories, make-up kits, shoes etc.) for the bride.

Maayra, or Bhaat, is a pre-wedding ritual in Rajasthani marriage traditions, particularly among Marwaris, emphasising familial bonds. Held a day or two before the wedding, it involves the maternal uncle (Mama) and his family bringing gifts—clothing, jewellery, cash, and sweets—for the bride or groom, symbolizing the brother's ongoing commitment to his sister's family. The ceremony begins with the Bhaat Nyotana, where the mother invites her parental family, followed by a warm welcome, prayers, and a feast featuring Rajasthani delicacies.

=== Rituals in Bengal ===
Many types of rituals are celebrated in Bengali Hindu wedding. These include Patipatra, Pankhil, Ashirvad, Aiburo Bhat, Dadhi Mangal, Gaye Halud, Shankha Kangkan, Ganga Baran, Jalsoi, Bar Baran, Satpak, Shubhadrishti, Mala Badal, Kanya Sampradan, Anjali, Sindoor Daan, Basi Biye, Basar Jagaran, Kanakanjali, Badhu Baran, Kalratri, Bhat Kapor, Bou Bhat, Phulshajya etc.

=== Rituals in Nepal ===
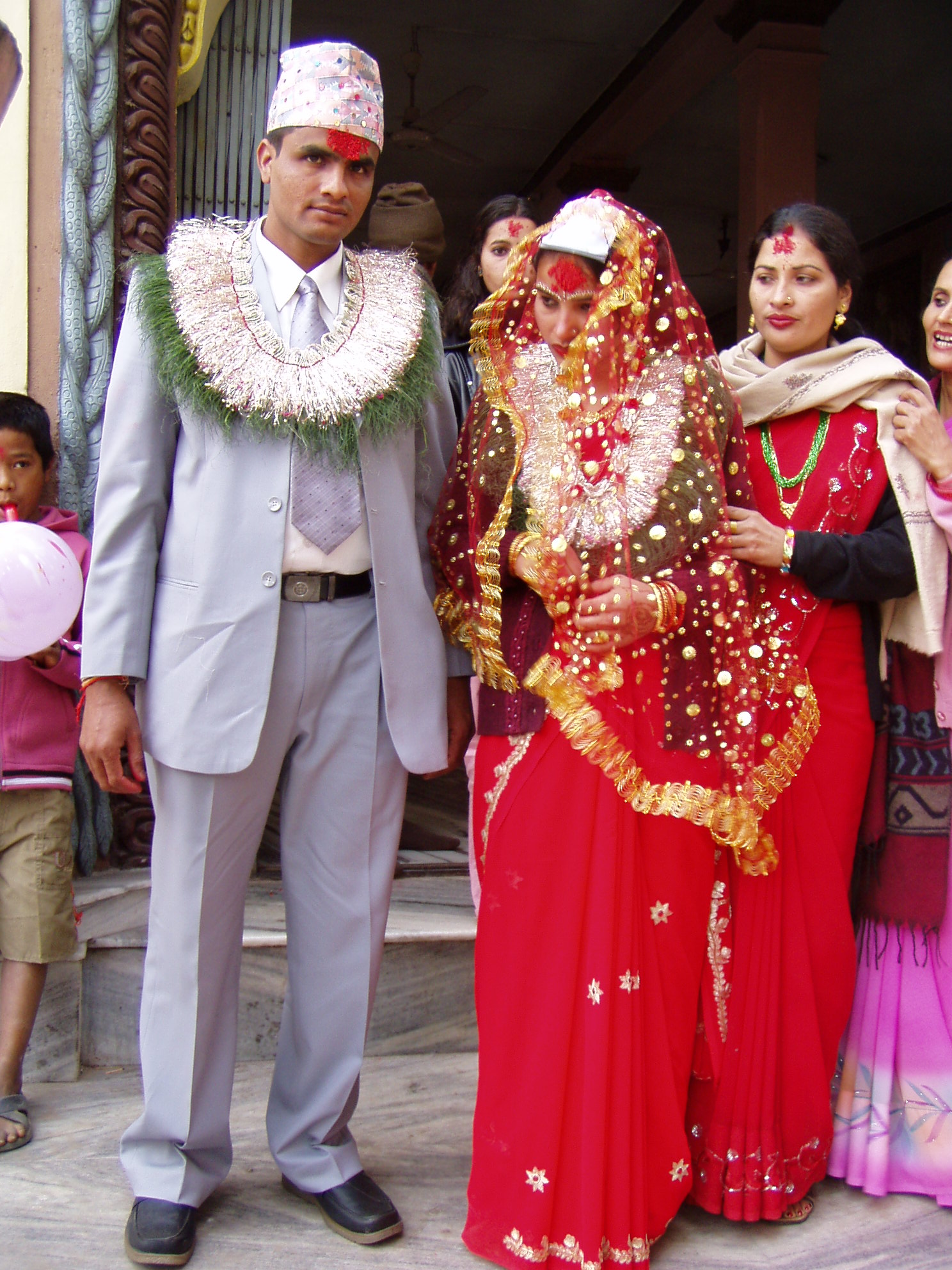
Groom and bride in a Nepali Parbatiya wedding at Narayangarh, Chitwan

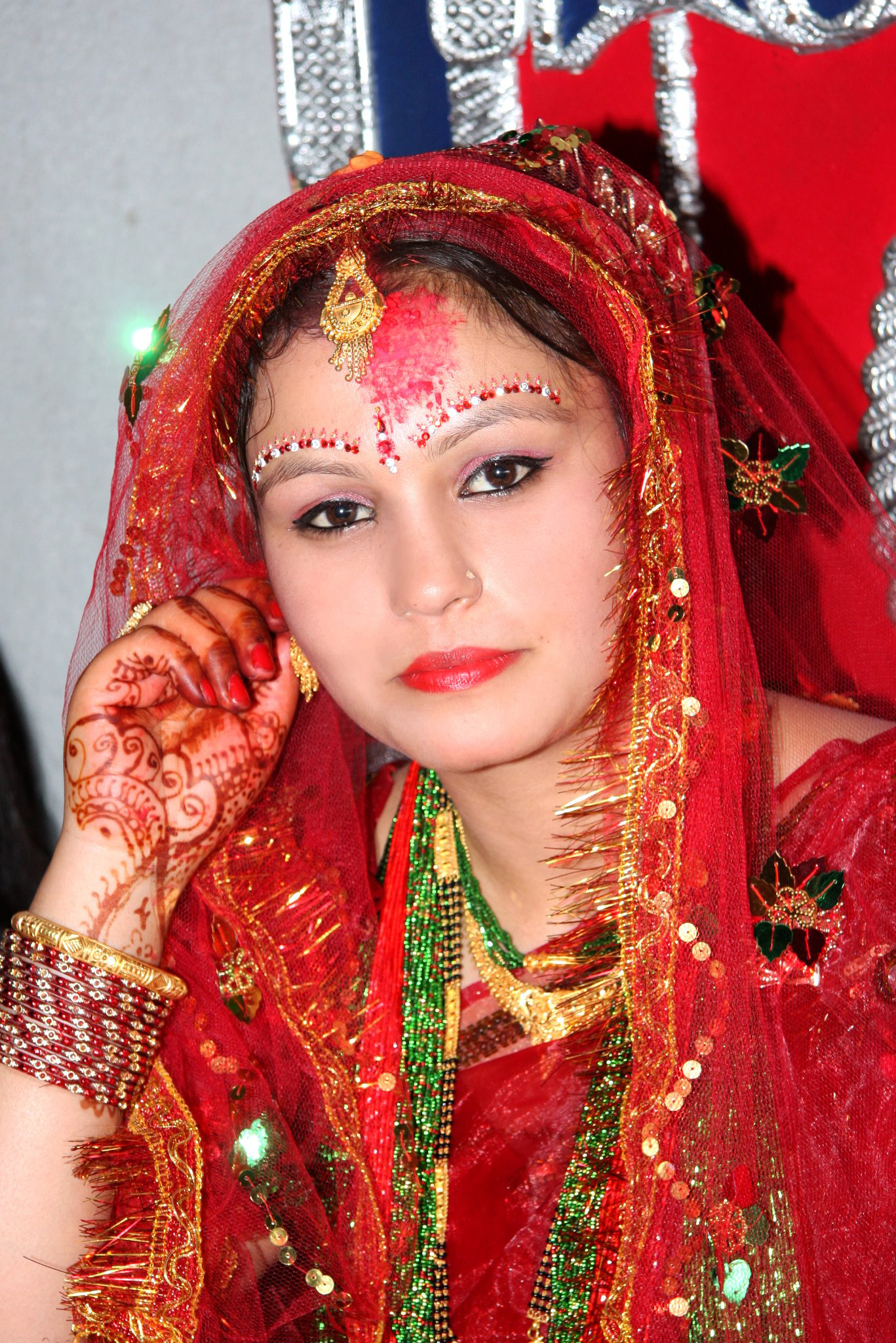
The bride is ceremoniously decorated, in Hindu weddings, by her friends and family in regional dress, jewelry, and body art called Mehndi. The body art is produced from a mixture of henna and turmeric. Above a Nepali bride.

In the Hindu culture of Nepal, marriage rituals are done by the Chhetri in a sixteen step process that centers on the household. The household is important during the marriage ritual because it is the center of the concept of mandala; the Chhetri's homes are considered to be domestic mandalas and so have roles as householders. The act of marriage brings men and women into the householder role.

In Nepali tradition, the "sindoor daan" (applying vermillion powder) is performed on a white cloth called "Aadar Patra", which symbolizes peace and purity, where the groom carefully applies the sindoor to the bride's forehead.

Marriage is the most important rite of passage for the Chhetris and is one of the most serious. Women move from their houses to the home of the groom after marriage. The ceremony is done in a precise and careful manner as to not bring bad luck to the families of the bride and groom; certain traditions, for example no one seeing the face of the bride until the end, are followed in order to ensure future prosperity. Prior to the marriage ceremony, there is no kinship between families of the bride and groom and the bride must be a virgin. The marriage ceremony consists of a series of rites that are performed over a two-day period between the houses of the bride and the groom. Within each home the enclosed area in the courtyard (jagya) and the kitchen are used the most; the jagya and the kitchen are considered the most important parts of the domestic mandala structure because it is where rice (an important part of the Chhetri's culture) is prepared and consumed. At the end of the ceremony is the establishment of the role of the wife and husband in the husband's home.

The first step in the marriage ceremony is called Purbanga. In the kitchen of their homes, the bride and the groom worship the seven Mother Goddesses as so to pay respect to their ancestors and ask for peace. In the second, third, and fourth step, the groom is then blessed by his mother and is taken outside to his jagya where his father and procession (janti) carry him and bring gifts for the bride to her house in a ceremony called dulähä anmäune. In the fifth step as the groom waits before the house of the bride, gifts of clothes and food are placed around the jagya; the father of the bride then places red paste on the groom's forehead indicating that he is no longer an outsider to his family. The sixth step is the performance of the Barani or welcoming for the groom and his janti as they enter the jagya. The father purifies the body of the groom using panchämrit (nectar from five pure liquids). A small feast is then held for the groom as the next steps in the marriage continue.

After the small feast, the marriage process for the bride begins. The seventh step takes place in the kitchen of the bride where the process of kanya dan starts; the bride's parents give their daughter in marriage to her groom thereby allowing the bride to be a part of the groom's lineage and making the father's lineage secondary. After they wash their feet they dress in red and, in the eighth step, sit beside in each other in the jagya. They perform post-marriage rites as they make sacrificial offerings to the fire in the center of the jagya. During these rites the bride and groom perform tasks such as placing red powder in the hair of the bride and the bride eats leftover food of the groom and at the end the now husband gives his wife a personal name for which she is to be called by.

After the post-marriage ceremony, the married couple being to leave the bride's home. In the ninth step, the husband and wife return to the kitchen of the wife and worship their ancestors and the seven Mother Goddesses. In the tenth, eleventh, and twelfth step, the couple leave the wife's house as she is given a garland from her parents; the wife and husband enter the jagya and are then escorted out riding on palanquins as they return to their permanent home of the husband. The thirteenth step beings once they enter the jagya of the groom and his virgin sisters welcome the wife in a ceremony called arti syäl. They unveil the bride and adorn her with flower garlands and sprinkle puffed rice on her (a sign of prosperity). The fourteenth step is completed once the bride promises gifts to the sisters; she then moves on the fifteenth step where she steps on piles of rice in a path toward the kitchen. The final step is a series of rites, the first of which is the bride worshiping the ancestors and deities of the husband; she then demonstrates her skills in handling rice to the husband's mother and sisters and then they entwine her hair. Finally, the mother unveils the bride again in front of the husband and in a ceremony called khutta dhog, the bride places the foot of the mother on her forehead thereby ending the marriage ceremony.

== Wedding and married life in Hinduism ==
While there are many rituals in Hinduism, such as those at birth and deaths of loved ones, the Hindu wedding is the most important and extensive personal ritual an adult Hindu undertakes in his or her life. Typical Hindu families spend significant effort and financial resources to prepare and celebrate weddings.

=== Economics ===
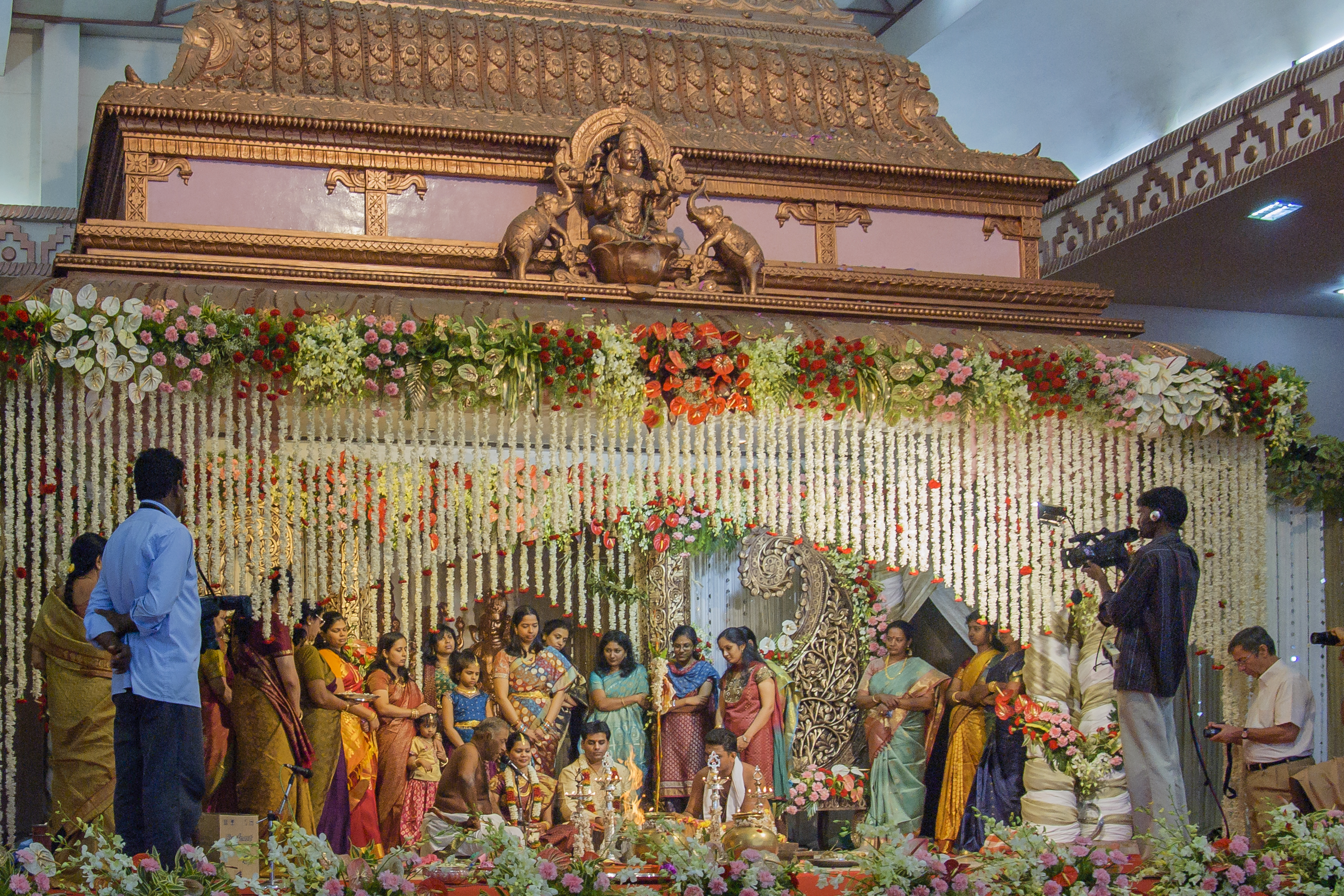
Indian Hindu wedding taking place in Puducherry, Tamil Nadu, India

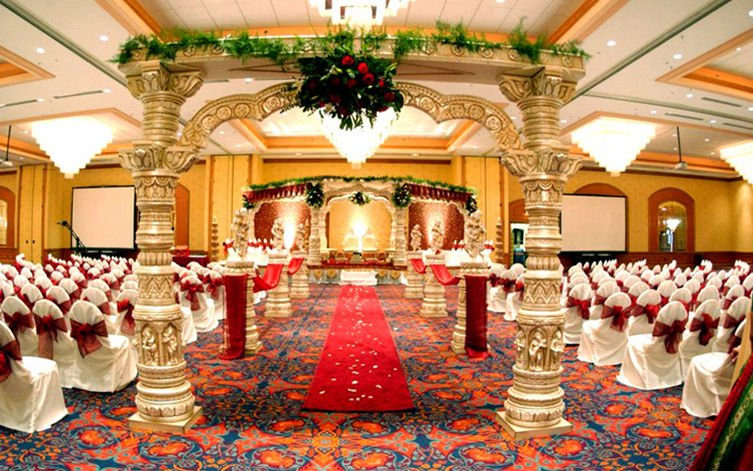
Typical Indian Hindu Wedding Decorations

In 2008, the Indian wedding market was estimated to be $31 billion a year. Various sources estimate India celebrates about 10 million weddings per year, and over 80% of these are Hindu weddings. The average expenditures exceed US$3,000 per wedding. Another $30 billion per year is spent on jewelry in India, with jewelry for weddings being the predominant market.

=== Law ===
In India, where most Hindus live, the laws relating to marriage differ by religion. According to the Hindu Marriage Act of 1955, passed by the Parliament of India, for all legal purposes, all Hindus of any caste, creed or sect, Sikh, Buddhists and Jains are deemed Hindus and can intermarry. By the Special Marriage Act, 1954, a Hindu can marry a person who is not Hindu, employing any ceremony, provided specified legal conditions are fulfilled. By Section 7 of Hindu Marriage Act, and tradition, no Hindu marriage is binding and complete before the seventh step of the saptapadi ritual, in presence of fire, by the bride and the groom together. In some cases, such as South Indian Hindu marriages, this is not required as the saptapadi is not performed.

=== Married life ===
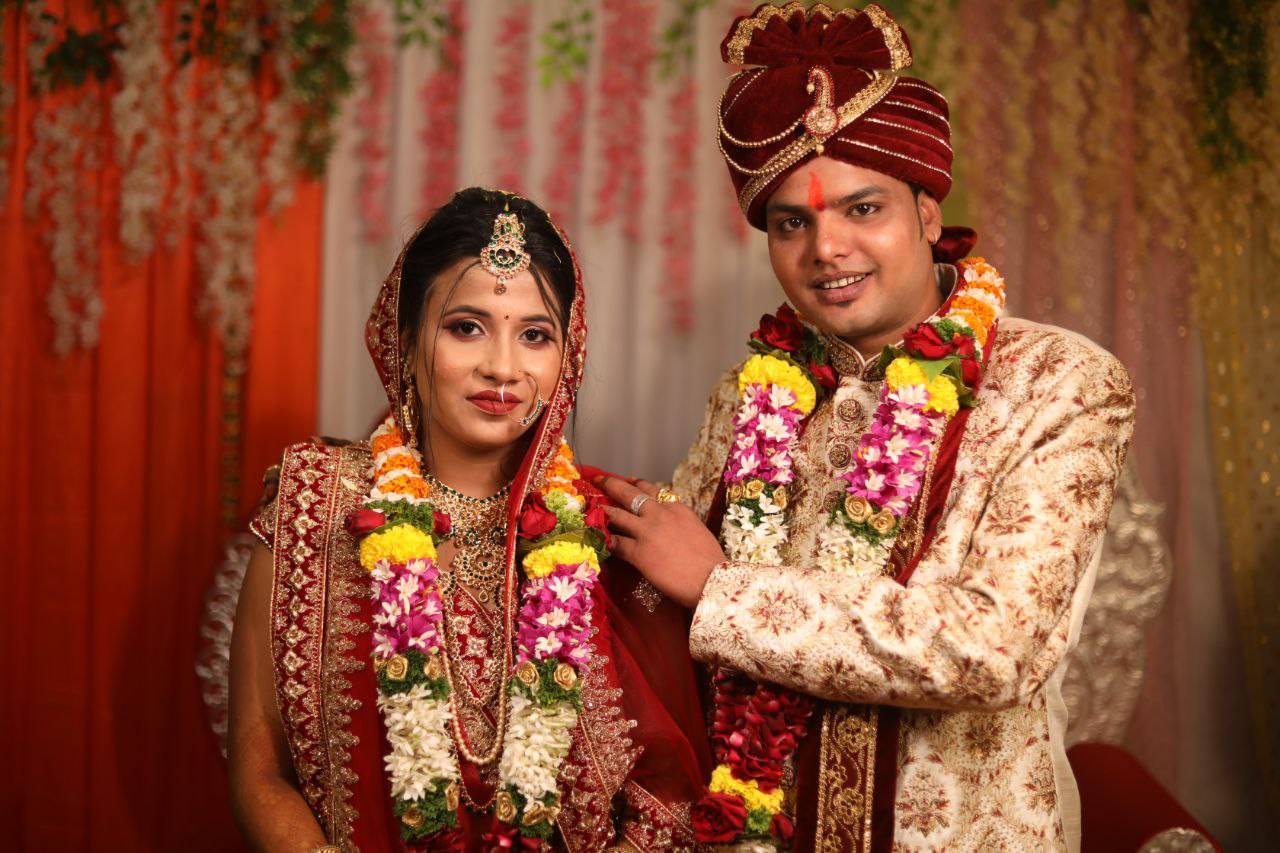
Indian Hindu bride and groom on wedding day

A Vedic sage emphasized that the basis of a happy and fulfilling married life is the presence of unity, intimacy and love between a husband and wife physically, mentally and spiritually. Hence the wife is considered to be the Ardhangani of the husband as per Hindu tradition. Marriage is not for self-indulgence, but is considered to be a life-long social and spiritual responsibility. Married life is considered an opportunity for two people to grow as life partners into soulmates.

A Kohbar geet, sung during Hindu wedding rituals in the Magahi region

== See also ==
- Hindu wedding cards
- Mangala sutra
- Marriage in Hinduism
- Shuddhikaran ceremony before a Hindu marriage
- Weddings in India
- Monogamy (cultural arguments)
- Pativrata
- Sindoor
