= Kanyadana =

Hindu wedding ritual

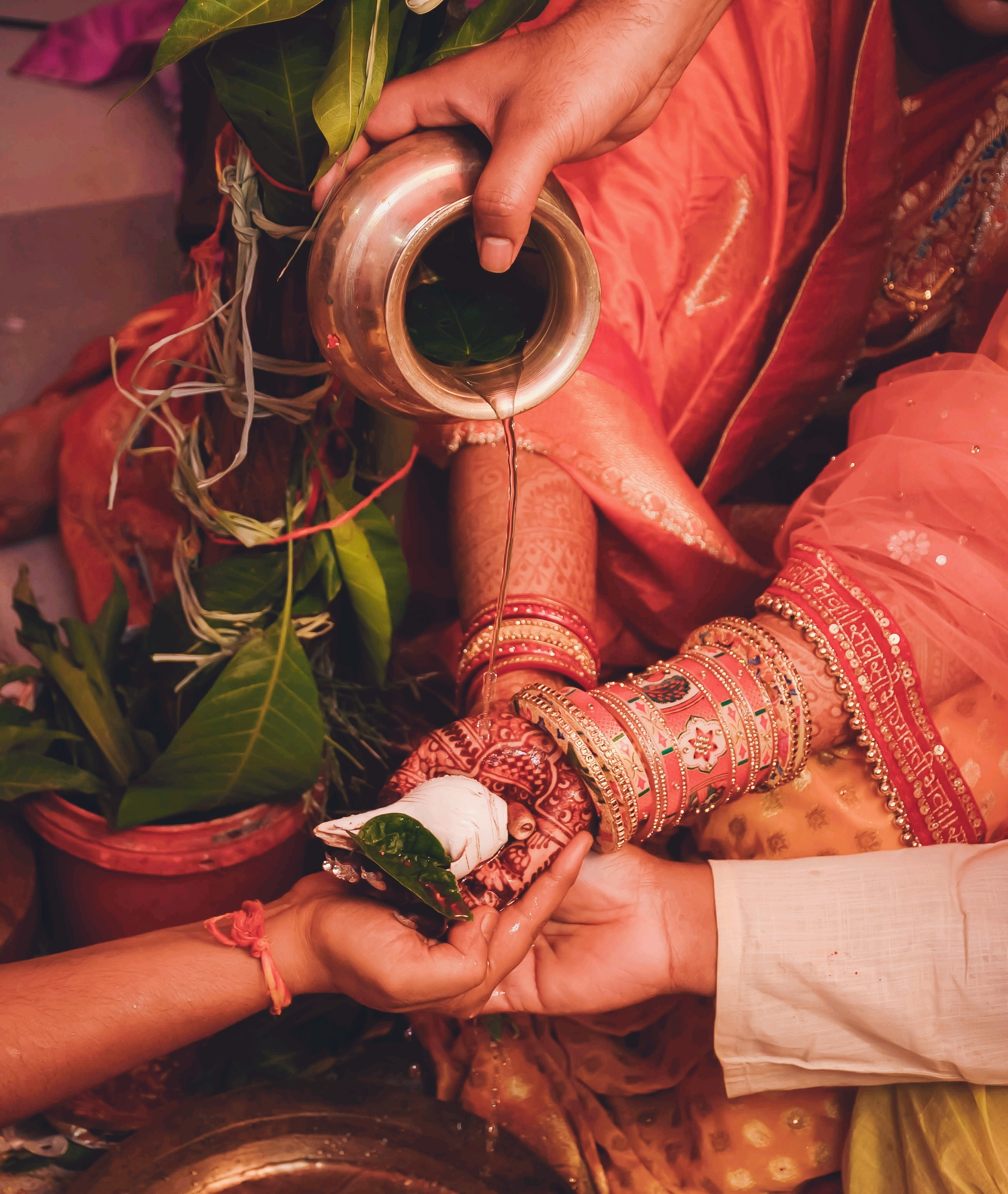
Performance of the kanyadana

Kanyadana (Sanskrit: कन्यादान, romanized: Kanyādāna) is a Hindu wedding ritual. Inscriptional evidence of this tradition can be found on 15th century stones found in the Vijayanagara Empire in South India. There are different interpretations regarding kanyadana across South Asia.

The kanyadana ritual occurs before the sindoor ritual (sinduradana).

== Etymology ==
Kanyadana is made of the Sanskrit words kanyā (maiden) and dāna (giving away), referring to the tradition of a father giving his daughter in marriage to a groom, symbolizing the transfer of responsibility and care from one family to another.

== Kanyadana songs ==
The wedding ritual may be accompanied by a variety of kanyadana songs. These songs may include the parents lamenting the loss of their daughter. Other songs focus on the groom, sometimes comparing him to Rama, portrayed in the Ramayana as the "ideal groom".

== See also ==
- Vivaha
- Marriage in Hinduism
