= Nishekam =

Hindu ritual associated with first sexual intercourse

Nishekam is the ritual associated with first sexual intercourse among Hindu married couples.

== Rituals ==
The veracity of this ritual is yet to be determined. In popular practice, the bride and the groom have a special arrangement where they engage in sexual activity on the very first night at a pre-determined auspicious time. It depends upon which Grhya Sutras the locality and family follows.

Majority of the North Indians follow Shukla Yajurveda, so they do it on 4th day after Vivaham (marriage). Consummation is allowed only on the night of the 4th day after marriage. Whereas other kalpasutras mention it just after Griha Pravesham, which occurs next day of marriage in many areas. After Griha Pravesha and before Nishekam the couple is not allowed to talk or see each other. The bride is kept in a company of ladies up to Nisheka.

=== Garbhadhana ===
It is similar to the preparatory ritual for Garbhadhana ceremony in many aspects as it allows the couple to prepare for begetting a child.
