= 2006 Noida serial murders =

Series of crimes in Uttar Pradesh, India

Surinder Koli
- Born: 1970; Almora district, Uttar Pradesh (present-day Uttarakhand), India
- Died: 18 September 2026 (aged 55–56); Haridwar, Uttarakhand, India
- Cause of death: Suicide by hanging
- Other names: Subhash Koli, Surendra Koli, Satish
- Status: Committed suicide on 18 September 2026
- Conviction: Acquitted

Details
- Victims: 19+ suspected
- Span of crimes: 8 February 2006 – 25 October 2006
- Country: India
- State: Uttar Pradesh
- Location: D-5, Sector-31, Noida near Nithari Village
- Date apprehended: 27 December 2006

The 2006 Noida serial murders (also Nithari serial murders or Nithari case) occurred in the house of businessman Moninder Singh Pandher in Sector-31, Noida near Nithari village, Uttar Pradesh, India, between 2005 and 2006. Moninder Singh was convicted in two out of the five cases against him, and his servant Surinder Koli, who supposedly aided him, was convicted in 10 out of the 16 cases against him. Both were originally sentenced to death, but in 2023, Allahabad High Court acquitted them citing lack of evidence. In November 2025, the Supreme Court upheld Koli's acquittal and ordered his release. Koli died by suicide on 18 September 2026 in Haridwar, Uttarakhand.

== Events leading to primary investigation ==
In December 2006, two Nithari village residents reported they knew the location of the remains of children who had gone missing in the previous two years: the municipal water tank behind house D5, Sector-31, Noida. Both had daughters who were missing, and they suspected Surinder Koli, the domestic help at D5, was involved in the disappearances. The residents claimed they had been repeatedly ignored by local authorities; therefore, they sought the help of former Resident Welfare Association (RWA) President S C Mishra. That morning, Mishra and the two residents searched one of the residences and claimed to have found a decomposed hand, after which they contacted the police.

Anxious parents of children missing in the last two years rushed to Nithari with photographs. Koli, under the alias Satish, later confessed to killing six children and a 20-year-old woman referred to as "Payal" after sexually assaulting them.

The families of the missing children accused the police of negligence. Initially, some police officers, including Noida SP city, denied any criminal angle, asserted that the families had provided false information about the ages of the missing, and claimed that they weren't minors but instead were adults who left home after fighting with their parents. The residents also alleged that the police were corrupt and were paid to conceal information. Demands were made for an independent investigation. One of the residents asserted that the police were claiming credit for discovering the bodies when it was the residents who dug them up. The police denied having found 15 bodies, reiterating that they had discovered skulls, bones and other body parts, and said they were unable to give a figure for the number of victims. The victims' identities and number could only be established with DNA tests. The police then sealed the house and did not allow news media near the site.

The Central government tried to ascertain the facts behind the discovery of the skeletal remains and whether it had "inter-state ramifications". Law and order are state matters, but the Home Ministry asked for details about the magnitude of the crime.

On 26 and 27 December respectively, Koli's employer, Moninder Singh Pandher, and Koli were taken into custody by the police in connection with the disappearance of "Payal". After Koli's confession, the police started digging up the nearby land area and discovered the children's bodies.

Two policemen were suspended on 31 December for failing to take action despite being informed about a number of children missing, as angry residents charged the house of the alleged mastermind, demanding the removal of the Mulayam Singh government.

The situation at Nithari was aggravated as an angry mob of villagers fought with police, then pelting stones at each other, just outside the residence of the accused. The police also detained Pandher's maid Maya under suspicion that she lured women to the house. As more body parts were dug up near the premises, hundreds of local residents descended on the spot and alleged that there was an organ trade connection to the grisly killings of young children. A doctor living close to the Pandher residence, Navin Choudhary, had been under police suspicion a few years prior in connection with an alleged kidney racket at his hospital. Searches were conducted throughout his properties, and the investigators found no evidence to support the claim.

== Primary investigation ==
On 1 January 2007, the remand magistrate granted the police custody of Pandher and Surinder Koli until 10 January 2007, as the investigators said that further interrogation was required to complete the recovery of victims' remains. The court also granted permission for Narco Analysis. On the same evening, police conducted a raid on Pandher's Chandigarh residence. His wife and son were interrogated about Pandher's habits. Police sources disclosed that their relationship with him was "strained", which was later found untrue. His behaviour was described as normal. A senior police inspector revealed that there would be a series of searches conducted at Pandher's Ludhiana farmhouse and nearby places. The recent child kidnapping cases in Chandigarh – Pandher's hometown – were re-opened, but nothing was found.

The next day, 15 of the 17 skeletons discovered in the village were identified. Ten of them were identified by Koli when he was confronted with the photographs of the missing children. Five others were identified by family members after being shown belongings recovered from the scene. The torsos of the bodies were missing and the investigating team was looking into possibilities that the killings were motivated by illicit trade in human organs. The police said that there were at least 31 child victims.

Security was increased as police expected more disturbance, following two days of violence near Pandher's residence. In a press statement, Chief Justice of India Y. K. Sabharwal asserted that the investigation was at a preliminary level, and neither the courts nor the Central Bureau of Investigation (CBI) were involved at that point.

=== Inquiry committee report ===
The Central Government, however, constituted a high-level inquiry committee to go into the police lapses, during the period of reporting and investigation. Chief Minister of Uttar Pradesh, Mulayam Singh Yadav said that he would await the report of the committee looking into the issue before making the decision on whether there should be a CBI probe into the matter. The committee was headed by the Joint Secretary, Women and Child Development Ministry, Manjula Krishnan. Under the terms of the reference,

- This committee would take stock of the efforts made by the Noida police in locating the children who went missing.
- It would assess the level of cooperation and assistance provided by the local administration, to locate the missing children and unite them with their families.
- It would go through the modus operandi and the motives of the accused.

The panel met the parents of the victims to record their statements even as the police determined that out of the 17 confirmed people killed, 10 were girls. Parents of eight of the sexually abused children were given compensation of Rs. 12 lakhs. The DNA samples from the human remains were sent to a forensic laboratory in Hyderabad for the identification of the victims while forensic samples were sent to the laboratory in Agra to determine the age, cause of death, and other details. It was determined that "Payal" was the only adult victim identified, with all other 11 victims below the age of 10. Seven of the eight families that had been provided compensation of Rs. 200,000 on 3 January 2007 returned their cheques in protest. However, the cheques were soon returned to them. They demanded houses and jobs in compensation as well.

After pressure and public outcry, the Uttar Pradesh Government suspended two superintendents of police and dismissed six policemen for dereliction of duty. This action followed the report by the four-member committee. On 17 January 2007 the inquiry committee submitted its reports indicting the Uttar Pradesh Police for "gross negligence" in handling the cases of missing persons. The committee said that the local administration was negligent and irresponsible while dealing with the missing persons reports and did not rule out organ trade as a possible motive behind the killings.

The two accused in the case were already in police custody while the skeletal remains of the young children were being unearthed from behind and in front of Pandher's residence. An FIR had been filed on 7 October 2006. Investigations revealed that Payal's cellphone was being used although the SIM card she owned remained inactive. Through digital surveillance, the investigators were able to track down a number of people and could finally reach the man who sold the phone. The rickshaw cart puller affirmed that the phone belonged to someone from the Pandher residence. After the affirmation of the facts by the witness, Moninder Singh was called for interrogation, which subsequently revealed nothing. His aide and servant, Surinder Koli was picked up the next day and he confessed to killing the woman and dumping her body behind the house. The police started digging and henceforth recovered the skeletal remains of the missing children instead of Payal.

Nand Lal, the father of the girl – Deepika alias Payal, alleged that the police had threatened and harassed him. He stated that it was because of the court intervention that the police officers registered the FIR.

=== Suspicions of organ trade and cannibalism ===
The police initially suspected an organ trade angle as to the motive behind the murders and raided the house of a doctor who lived in the neighbourhood of the primary accused. A team of officials, accompanied by a team of forensic experts, went to pick up possible evidence for tests. The police revealed that the doctor had been accused of a similar crime in 1998, although the court had absolved him the same year. There was a second raid a few days later. The police were, however, cautious with the news reports suggesting the accused committed cannibalism even before the polygraph tests had barely begun. They were "aghast" when they learned of media reports that one of the accused had confessed to the consumption of the victims' livers and other body parts. Such a possibility was not ruled out by the investigating team, considering the amount of brutality the duo had allegedly committed on the victims.

=== Brain mapping and narco analysis ===
The accused duo were brought to the Directorate of Forensic Sciences in Gandhinagar city in order to undergo brain mapping and polygraph tests on 4 January 2007 and narco analysis five days later. The police director told the scribes that both the accused had been cooperative during the tests and examinations. A senior director of the institute announced the conclusion of the extensive tests and declared that a conclusion had been drawn. Surinder Koli had confessed to the crimes and had given his employer a clean chit saying that he was unaware of Koli's actions. Surinder Koli also revealed that all deaths had taken place through strangulation. He would then rape them before taking the bodies to his personal washroom and dismembering them. Pandher was declared to be a womaniser and depressed.

== CBI investigation ==
After four days of discourse and mounting pressure from the Government of India, the Uttar Pradesh Government decided to hand over the inquiry to the Central Bureau of Investigation. The notification came after the Department of Personnel and Training, which governs the CBI, sent a letter to the state government making a proper request for a probe by the agency in line with the prescribed norms.

The two accused were taken to the CBI headquarters in Mumbai Jail on the night of 11 January 2007, a day before the investigation was to be transferred to the Central Bureau of Investigation. The CBI continued its investigation and discovered three more skulls and human remains at the site of the serial killings. The investigators searched the drains outside the house and found three skulls, believed to be of the children, and several body parts, including parts of legs, bones, and torso. Several objects were found that are believed to belong to the victims. The exhibits were sealed and forwarded to forensic labs.

The Central inquiry committee that investigated the serial killings discovered serious lapses on the part of the police in handling the cases of missing persons. The reports were incriminating and proclaimed that the local police failed in their duty to respond to complaints over the past two years.

The discovery of several polythene bags containing parts of human torsos led the investigators to conclude that it was unlikely that the accused had links to illegal organ trade. The CBI team discovered the bags in the drains outside the Pandher residence. After interrogating Surinder Koli, they came to a prima facie conclusion that "he is a psychopath used to carry out the killings". Interrogators also said that it was possible that Pandher had no role to play in the murders. The seized materials were sent to the laboratory for post-mortem, individualisation, and DNA extraction. The materials received from the Uttar Pradesh police were also forwarded for forensic examination. Some liquor bottles, a double-barreled gun, cartridges, mobile phones, photographs, photo albums and a blood-stained grill were handed over to the CBI for extensive examination. Preliminary investigations revealed that the bones were not more than two years old. The CBI also revealed that only 15 skulls had been found thus far, and not 17 as claimed by the state police.

A three-member CBI team questioned the kin of Surinder Koli in the Almora district.

In November 2007, the Supreme Court notified the CBI concerning the case about the allegation by a relative of a victim that the investigating agency was trying to shield Moninder Singh Pandher, one of the key accused in the case.

== Victims ==
Payal was the only adult victim in the string of serial murders. Young girls constituted the majority of victims. Post-mortem reports of the 17 sets of skulls and bones recovered showed that 11 of the killed were girls. Doctors at Noida Government Hospital revealed that there was a "butcher-like precision" in the chopping of the bodies. The post mortem reports revealed that there had been a pattern in the killings. A gory revelation was made by the AIIMS on 6 February 2007. It was also concluded that there were 19 skulls in all; 16 complete and 3 damaged. The bodies had been cut into three pieces before being disposed of by the servant. The CBI sources said that the manservant, after strangling the victims, severed their heads and threw them in the drain behind the house of his employer. Sources also revealed that he used to keep the viscera in a polythene bag before disposing of it in a drain, so as to prevent detection. The skulls and the other remains were forwarded to the Centre for DNA Fingerprinting and Diagnostics, Hyderabad for further profiling. The crime scene examination, recovery and collection of human remains and exhibits and their detailed examination was carried out by experts from AIIMS and CFSL under the chairmanship and guidance of professor T D Dogra.

== Convictions ==
On 12 February 2009, both the accused—Moninder Singh Pandher and his domestic servant Surinder Koli—were found guilty of the 8 February 2005 murder of Rimpa Haldar, 14, by a special sessions court in Ghaziabad. This verdict left the Central Bureau of Investigation (CBI) red-faced, as the CBI had earlier given a clean chit to Moninder Singh Pandher in all its chargesheets. Both the accused Moninder Singh Pandher and Surinder Koli were given the death sentence on 13 February 2009, as the case was classified as "rarest of rare".

- On 4 May 2010, Koli was found guilty of the 25 October 2006 murder of Arti Prasad, 7, and given a second death sentence eight days later.
- On 27 September 2010, Koli was found guilty of the 10 April 2006 murder of Rachna Lal, 9, and given a third death sentence the following day.
- On 22 December 2010, Koli was found guilty of the June 2006 murder of Deepali Sarkar, 12, and given a fourth death sentence.
- On 15 February 2011, the Supreme Court upheld the death sentence of Surinder Koli.
- On 24 December 2012, Koli was found guilty of the 4 June 2005 murder of Chhoti Kavita, 5, and given a fifth death sentence.

On 10 September 2009, the Allahabad High Court acquitted Moninder Singh Pandher and overturned his death sentence. He was not named a main suspect by investigators initially but was summoned as co-accused during the trial. While Pandher was acquitted, the court at this time upheld the death sentence for Surinder Koli, his former domestic servant.

In February 2011, the Supreme Court of India upheld the death sentence against both suspects. In July 2014, the President of India rejected the mercy petitions filed by Koli. On 3 September 2014, the Court issued a death warrant against Koli in the Nithari case. On the evening of 4 September 2014, Koli was transferred to Meerut Jail because of the absence of hanging facilities at Dasna Jail, Ghaziabad. He was to be hanged on 12 September 2014. The Supreme Court stayed the death sentence for one week after a petition was filed for Koli. The court stopped Koli's hanging at a midnight hearing, saying an inordinate delay in execution was valid grounds for commutation. But on 29 October 2014, the Supreme Court bench headed by the Chief Justice of India H. L. Dattu rejected the death sentence review petition stating that the court had not committed any error in judgement.

On 28 January 2015, however, the High Court bench headed by Chief Justice D. Y. Chandrachud and Justice P. K. S. Baghel commuted Koli's death sentence to life imprisonment on the ground of "inordinate delay" in deciding his mercy petition. But in 2019, Koli was again given a death sentence in the 10th conviction.

== Acquittal, release, and death of Koli ==
On 16 October 2023, 17 years after the crimes were discovered, Koli and Pandher were acquitted of all charges against them, after appeals filed by the two suspects. Both were acquitted by the Allahabad High Court due to a lack of convincing evidence other than the confessions of the accused. The court declared:

The casual and perfunctory manner in which important aspects of arrest, recovery and confession have been dealt with are most disheartening, to say the least.... It appears to us that the investigation opted for the easy course of implicating a poor servant of the house by demonising him, without taking due care of probing more serious aspects of possible involvement of organised activity of organ trading.... Upon evaluation of the evidence led in this case, on the touchstone of fair trial guaranteed to an accused under Article 21, we hold that the prosecution has failed to prove the guilt of accused S.K. and Pandher beyond reasonable doubt, on the settled parameters of a case based on circumstantial evidence.

The decision came as a shock for the victims' families who were hoping for justice. Pappu Lal, a security guard whose eight-year-old daughter was killed in the serial killings, said after the judgement: "We don't have this much money that we can keep fighting for justice for so many years." Durga Prasad, whose seven-year-old daughter was murdered, declared: "This court might have acquitted those monsters but there is a bigger court of God who will not spare them".

On 11 November 2025, the Supreme Court acquitted Koli in the last remaining case; he was released the next day. On 18 September 2026, Koli was discovered dead and hanging inside his tea stall in Haridwar, Uttarakhand.

== In popular culture ==
A BBC documentary on the case titled Slumdog Cannibal was released in 2012. In 2017, an Indian documentary film titled The Karma Killings was released on Netflix, directed by Ram Devineni.

The case was included as one of the cases in the bestselling book The Deadly Dozen: India's Most Notorious Serial Killers (2019) by Anirban Bhattacharyya, the creator-producer of the hit TV show Savdhaan India. The book offered alternate viewpoints to the case, suggesting that the Noida Police botched the investigation and that Pandher and Koli were innocent; it also discussed the possibility of an organ-trafficking nexus. In 2023, much of this was corroborated when the Allahabad High Court acquitted Pandher and Koli, referring to a "botched up probe".

The case was also covered in an episode of the true crime podcast titled The Desi Crime Podcast and an episode of RedHanded titled "Village of the Damned: The Nithari Child Murders". The 2011 Indian film Murder 2 by Mohit Suri and starring Emraan Hashmi, Jacqueline Fernandez and Prashant Narayanan was inspired from this case. In 2024, Netflix released a movie entitled Sector 36, loosely based on the case.

== See also ==
- List of serial killers by country § India
- Elanthoor human sacrifice case, another reported case of cannibalism in India
