= Timeline of human sacrifices =

This is a list of notable human sacrifices and events relating to them.

== Ancient ==
- 3500 BC: Three men were sacrificed during a burial, near the town of Shendi in modern Sudan. Their remains were found alongside two dogs and ceramics.
- 31st century BC: Pharaoh Hor-Aha was buried alongside his servants in the first Egyptian case of retainer sacrifice.
- 30th century BC: Pharaoh Qa'a was buried alongside his servants in the last Egyptian case of retainer sacrifice.
- c. 3000 BC: Archeological evidence of human sacrifice in Başur Höyük in Turkey.
- 2500 BC: Human sacrifice was performed in ancient city of Ur.
- 1700–1550 BC: Evidence of human sacrifice by Kerma culture in modern Sudan.

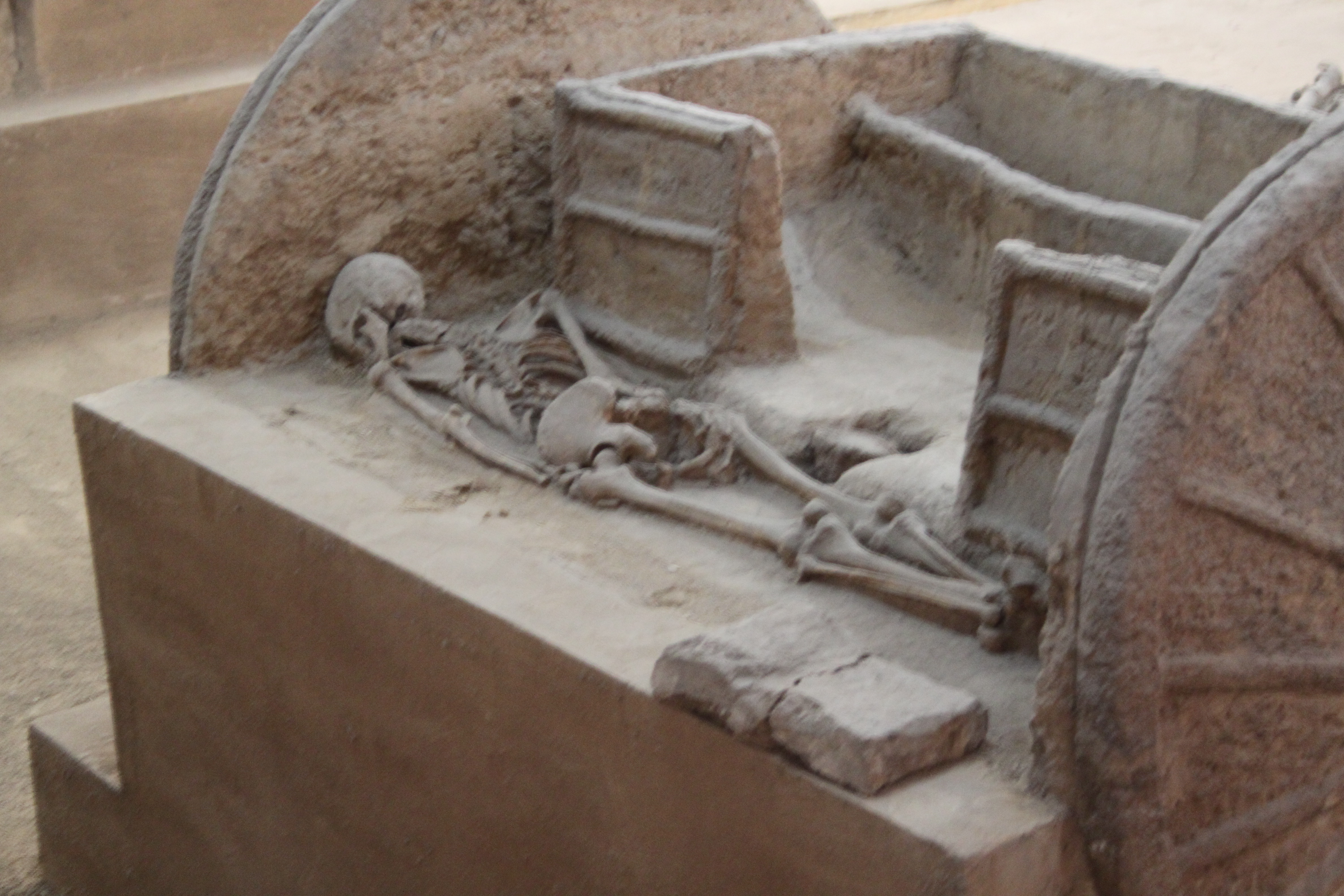
Human sacrifice from the Shang dynasty in China

- 1200 BC: Fu Hao of the Shang Dynasty was buried alongside 16 sacrificed humans.
- 9th century BC: Arzhan culture kurgan contains evidence of human sacrifice among Scythian people.
- 678 BC: Duke Wu, the tenth ruler of Qin, had 66 people buried with him.
- 621 BC: The 14th ruler Duke Mu had 177 people buried with him, including three senior government officials
- 6th–4th century BC: Archeological evidence of human sacrifice in south-western Bulgaria.
- 537 BC: When Duke Jing of Qin died, 186 humans were buried with him, victims of funereal human sacrifice.
- 5th century BC: Herodotus reports of human sacrifice among Scythian people.
- 480 BC: According to Plutarch, Greek commander Themistocles sacrificed three Persian prisoners of war before the Battle of Salamis.
- 228 BC: First known case of human sacrifice in Ancient Rome.
- 216 BC: Second known case of human sacrifice in Ancient Rome: a pair of Vestal Virgins, Gauls, and Greeks were buried alive at Forum Boarium following defeat at Cannae.
- 145 BC: The ruler of the tribe of the Caeni, Diegylis, had sacrificed two young Greeks, and claimed that kings could not offer the same sacrificial victims as commoners.
- 122 BC: Nanyue king Zhao Mo was buried alongside 15 human sacrifice victims.
- 114 BC: Last human sacrifice occurred in Roman Republic: pair of Gauls and Greeks were buried alive at Forum Boarium.
- 97 BC: Roman senate outlawed human sacrifice.
- First century BC: Archeological remains of human sacrifice near the Egyin Gol River in Mongolia.

== Early Medieval ==
- 323: Emperor Nintoku of Japan had a divine revelation in his dream to the effect that there was a person named Kowakubi in the province of Musashi and a person called Koromono-ko in the province of Kawachi. If they should be sacrificed to deities of the two rivers respectively, then the construction of embankments would be easily achieved. Kowakubi was subsequently thrown into the torrent of the Kitakawa river, with a prayer offered. After the sacrifice the embankment was constructed, Koromono-ko however escaped being sacrificed.
- 404: Nine people were killed at the funeral of Yax Nuun Ahiin I.
- 456: Two adolescents were killed at the funeral of Sihyaj Chan Kʼawiil II.
- 464: First mention of sati (widow sacrifice) in Nepal – king Manadeva I forbade his mother from following this practice.
- 5h century: Human sacrifices occurred during building of Banwolseong palace in Korea.
- 4th–6th century: Traces of human sacrifice in Ballana burial site in Nubia.
- 589: According to a Chinese source human sacrifices were regularly performed at the Vat Phou temple in modern Laos.
- Late 7th century: According to a tale, Wulfram of Sens prevent a sacrifice of Frisian king Radbod's son.
- 502: King of Korea outlawed human sacrifice.
- The sixth-century Eastern Roman historian Menander Protector records that an embassy attending the funeral of Istemi Khagan was required by Tardu Khagan to cut their cheeks with swords in mourning. Four prisoners of war and Istemi’s warhorse were then driven into the deceased khagan’s tomb and buried with him.
- Theophanes also records a Khazar Turkic funeral involving human sacrifice: after a Khazar nobleman who had served as an ambassador in the Eastern Roman Empire died, his son buried alive thirty, or possibly three hundred, slave soldiers with him.
- 790: Draft version of the Lex Frisionum, which was in force during the transitory period before the conversion to Christianity contained a provision stipulating human sacrifice by drowning as a penalty for violating a pagan template.
- 845: Last human sacrifice in Ireland.
- 893: Last human sacrifice in Britain.
- 9th century: Burial with five sacrificed bodies was found in Igbo Ukwu town in Nigeria.

== 10th century ==
- c. 850 – 950: Remains of a ship excavated in Balladoole on the Isle of Man hint at the possibility of human sacrifice.
- 922: Arab traveler Ahmad Ibn Fadlan recorded funeral sacrifice of a female slave of dead Viking ruler in today's Kazan in Russia.
- 926: Following the death of Abaoji his widow Shulü Ping had over a hundred officials killed to accompany him in the afterlife.
- c. 978: Theodore the Varangian and his son John were killed during human sacrifice in pagan Kiev.
- 980: Four children were sacrificed according to archeological findings during building of Trelleborg fortress in Denmark.
- c. 980: According to archeological evidence a male was sacrificed to accompany a buried woman in a burial of the Liao dynasty discovered in Bazhalaga in China.
- 1000: Last human sacrifice in Iceland. Two men from each province were sacrificed.
- 10th century: Ibn Hawqal mentions human sacrifice in kingdom of Ghana.

== 11th century ==
- 1024: Human sacrifice by volkhvy reported in Suzdal in Russia.
- 1066: John Scotus (bishop of Mecklenburg) was sacrificed to Radegast, the god of hospitality.
- 1071: Human sacrifice of women by volkhvy was reported in a Rostov village in Rus.
- 11th century: Al-Bakri mentions sacrifice of servants during royal burial in Ghana.
- Late 11th century: Arabic writer Abd-el-Aziz El-Bekri describes funeral sacrifice of Nubian kings.

== 13th century ==
- Late 12th/early 13th century: Archeological evidence of sacrifice of 14 people in Shangjing town of Liao Dynasty.
- 1229: When Ögedei acceded to the throne of the Mongol Empire, the Genghis Khan's grave was honoured with three days of offerings and the sacrifice of thirty maidens.
- 1241: Eight volunteer warriors and twenty-six horses were sacrificed at the funeral of Jonas, chef of Cumans.
- 1265: Hulagu Khan funeral featured last known human sacrifice of rule descending from Genghis Khan.

== 14th century ==
- 1326: Following Nepali king Jayarudramalla death, four of his wives were burned.
- 1342: Gediminas's funeral included a human sacrifice, with his favourite servant and several German slaves being burned on the pyre with the corpse.
- 1350: More than 200 people were sacrificed during the Punta Lobos massacre by members of the powerful Chimu people as a sign of gratitude to their revered sea god Ni after they conquered the fishermen's fertile seaside valley.
- 1350s: During his travel to Africa Ibn Battuta mentions human sacrifice at the funeral of king of Gobir in Hausaland.
- 1389: Following the military victories in the land of Medininkai the Samogitians cast lots which indicated Marquard von Raschau, the commander of Klaipėda (Memel), as a suitable victim for gods and burnt him on horseback in full armour. It possibly was the last human sacrifice in medieval Europe.
- 1398: At least 38 concubines were killed as part of Hongwu's funeral human sacrifice.

== 15th century ==
- 1425: 10 concubines were buried alongside Hongxi Emperor following his death.
- 1439: Zhu Youdun, a grandson of Zhu Yuanzhang was buried alongside his wife and six concubines.
- 1464: Tianshun Emperor, in his will, forbade the practice of human sacrifice for Ming emperors and princes.
- 1481: When king Yakshamalla of Nepal died, one of his wives refused to become sati, while other was burned.
- 1490s: Al-Suyuti mentions of practice of substitute sacrifice in kingdom of Gobir which involved sick people killing others.

== 16th century ==
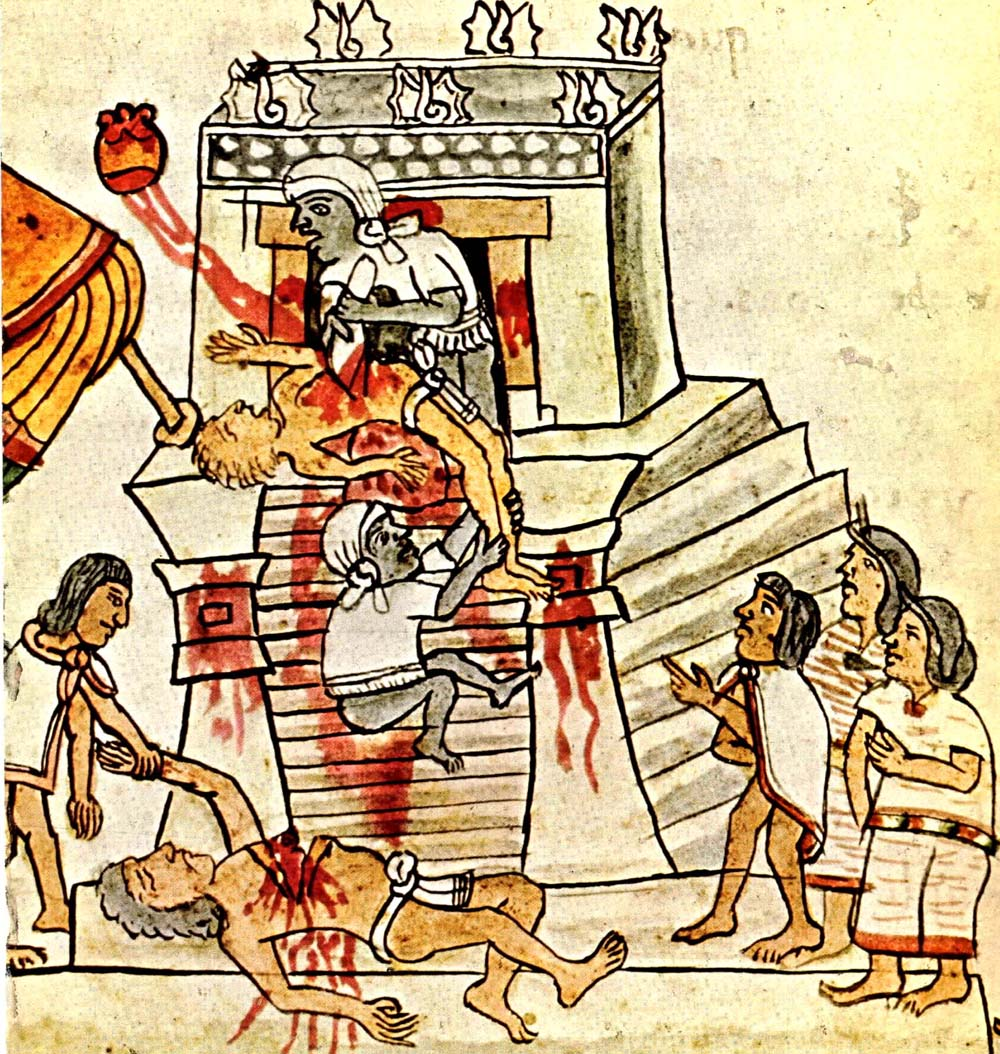
Aztec ritual human sacrifice portrayed in the Codex Magliabechiano

- 1500s: Valentin Fernandes mentions sacrifice of wives and attendants during burials of kings among Mandingo and Beafada people in the Guinea region.
- 1510s: Four or five survivors of the Santa María (1511 ship) shipwreck are allegedly ritually sacrificed in the Maya Lowlands.
- 1539: Mention by Christian missionaries of widespread human sacrifice in Benin kingdom.
- 1565: More than 140 men were allegedly beheaded as a sacrifice during the construction of the Kamakhya Temple.
- 1560s: Bayinnaung banned human sacrifice in the Burmese Empire.
- 1562: A testimony made on August 11, 1562 in which the Maya rebel leader Lorenzo Cocom had sacrificed young boys into the Sacred Cenote three months earlier.
- 1578: Altan Khan banned human sacrifice in Mongolia.
- 1592: Mạc Mậu Hợp was ritually killed in a last known case of human sacrifice in Vietnam.

== 17th century ==
- 1613: Jesit father Antonio Fernandez claimed during his visit to the Kingdom of Yamma that human sacrifices were performed during the funeral of a king.
- 1620s: Queen Nzinga of Ndongo and Matamba engaged in human sacrifice to boost morale of her troops.
- 1626: Following Nurhaci's death his sons coerced his primary consort Lady Abahai to commit suicide to accompany him in death.
- 1633: Jan Oosterwijck describes sacrifice of 22 female slaves during a burial of a queen on Bali island.
- 1634: Jeremias van Vliet describes sacrifice of four pregnant women during building a fort in Thailand.
- 1660s: Olfert Dapper mentions human sacrifice in kingdom of Vai in modern Sierra Leone, in Ivory Coast, Gold Coast and the kingdom of Allada.
- 1673: Emperor Kangxi of the Qing dynasty banned human sacrifice.
- 1674: When king Pratnamalla of Nepal died, nine of his wives were burned.
- 1676: Human sacrifices were performed during founding of Ava city in Myanmar.
- 1684: Three Franciscan friars were killed, probably by heart sacrifice, at the Manche Chʼol settlement of Paliac on the Caribbean coast of Belize. They included Francisco Custodio, Marcos de Muros, and an unnamed lay brother.
- February 1696: Franciscan friar Juan de San Buenaventura and an unspecified Franciscan companion were taken to Nojpetén during a skirmish between the Yucatec Spanish and the Itza on the west shore of Lake Petén Itzá. The Itza high priest AjKin Kan Ekʼ later related that he had the Franciscans bound in the form of crosses and then cut out their hearts. About a month later a Guatemalan Spanish expedition was ambushed and slaughtered; Dominican friars Cristóbal de Prada and Jacinto de Vargas were taken across to the island of Nojpetén and were similarly bound to X-shaped crosses before having their hearts cut out.
- 1687: When king Parthivendramalla of Nepal died, 24 of his wives were sacrificed.
- 1600s: Madagascar king Andriamasinavalona performed mock human sacrifice asking one man to volunteer and then released him and granted him immunity from punishment.

== 18th century ==
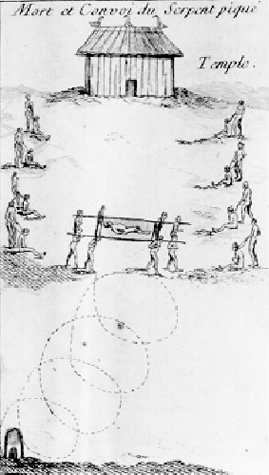
The funeral procession of Tattooed Serpent in 1725, with retainers waiting to be sacrificed

- 1706: Last recorded human sacrifice in the colonial era of Mesoamerica reportedly happened in a remote location near Tutla, Mexico.
- 1724: Chevalier des Marchais reported that human sacrifice was prevalent in Liberia.
- 1725: Upon the death of "Tattooed Serpent" in 1725, the war chief and younger brother of the "Great Sun" or Chief of the Natchez; two of his wives, one of his sisters (nicknamed La Glorieuse by the French), his first warrior, his doctor, his head servant and the servant's wife, his nurse, and a craftsman of war clubs all chose to die and be interred with him, as well as several old women and an infant who was strangled by his parents.
- 1727: 4,000 people were reportedly killed during a ceremony in Dahomey, though the author believes his source was exaggerating the number.
- 1750s: Queen Pokou in modern Ivory Coast allegedly sacrificed her son to cross a river.
- 1775: When king of Nepal Prithvinarayana Shaha died nine women including his wife were sacrificed.
- 1780: Nepal outlawed human sacrifice.
- 1785 – 1790: O ver 1,000 people were sacrificed during the reign of Kazembe VII of the Kazembe kingdom.
- 1795: Hawaiian king Kalanikūpule was captured and sacrificed to Kamehameha's war god, Kū-ka-ili-moku.
- 1798: When Duke Ephraim of the Duke Town died, 65 slaves were sacrificed at his funeral.

== 19th century ==
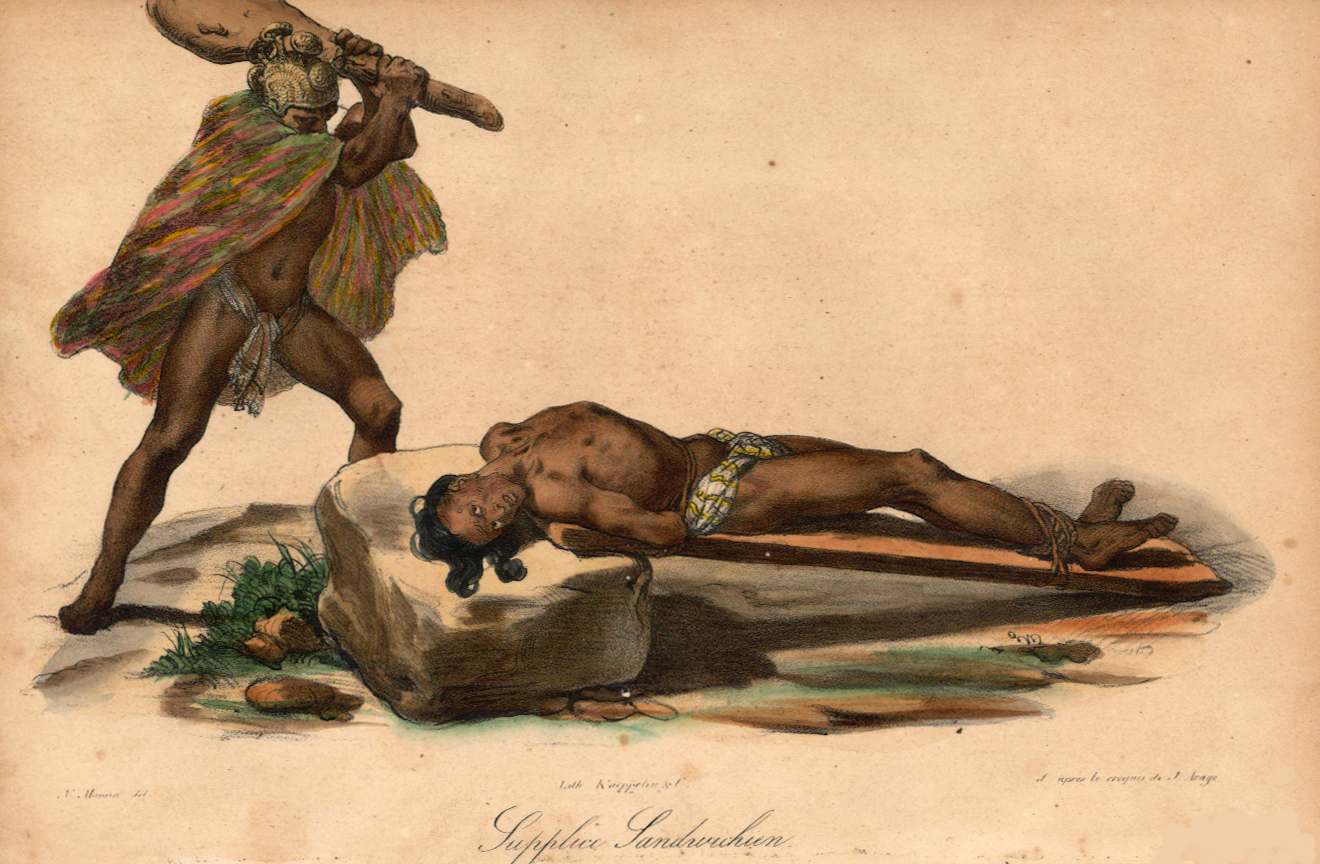
Hawaiian sacrifice, from Jacques Arago's account of Freycinet's travels around the world from 1817 to 1820.

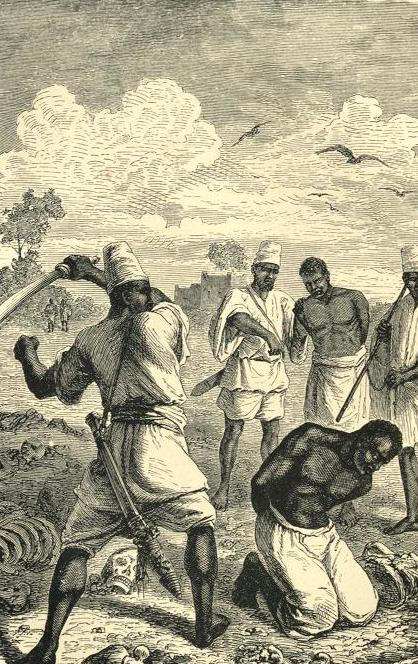
Human Sacrifice in Yoruba - Seventeen years in the Yoruba country. Memorials of Anna Hinderer - Illustration - Published 1877

- 1806: When king of Nepal Ranabahadura Shaha was assassinated, fourteen female slaves and one concubine were sacrificed. His wife was later forced to become sati.
- 1809: Kanihonui was ritually killed for having sexual affair with queen of Hawaii in possibly last case of ritual sacrifice in Hawaii.
- 1815: The last recorded human sacrifice in Tahiti, described by Samuel Henry, which took place after the battle of Fei Pi in 1815.
- 1817:
  - According to an account, in Tonga, a child was strangled to assist the recovery of a sick relation.
  - Comanche captive was saved from a sacrifice by the Pawnee tribe when Petalesharo intervened on his behalf.
- 1820: When Eyo Honesty of Creek Town died, over 200 slaves were sacrificed at his funeral.
- September 23, 1825: A spy sent by a British governor alleged to have witnessed a sacrifice of 15 men in the Danteshwari Temple.
- 1824: Last human sacrifice at the Cook Islands with a young boy being slain.
- 1827: Indian agent John Dougherty tried to prevent a sacrifice of a young girl by the Pawnee tribe, but she was killed by an angry mob.
- 1829: Bengal Sati Regulation, 1829 prohibited sacrifice of wives in British India.
- 1832: British administration reportedly stopped human sacrifices in the Assam region.
- 1834: When Duke Ephraim died hundreds of slaves and others were sacrificed at his funeral.
- 1838: In a last human sacrifice among the Pawnee tribe, Haxti, a 14-year-old Oglala Lakota girl was killed.
- 1839: Eighty women were strangled to accompany the spirits of their husbands to the next world in Viwa Island in Fiji.
- October 1843: An enslaved girl of the wife of a local chief was shot to accompany her to the next world on the island of Waiheke, near Auckland.
- January 7, 1842: 12-year old boy was sacrificed to help in recovery of local chief in Tonga, but the chief died anyway.
- 1843: Étienne Aymonier claims that during inauguration of a chef of the Kampong Svay district a man sentenced to death was sacrificed until 1843, when he was replaced by a bull.
- 1850: Funeral sacrifices were abolished in Old Calabar.
- 1853: Dahomey king limited ritual killings to criminals.
- 1854:
  - Prime minister of Nepal Jung Bahadur Rana restricted which women could be sacrificed during sati ritual, including criminalizing forcing woman to become sati.
  - When Tom Robin, head of Old Town died, slaves and wives were sacrificed at his funeral.
- 1857: During the founding of the city of Mandalay in Myanmar a pregnant woman was reportedly sacrificed.
- 1858: Following the death of Gezo, ritual killings of war captives resumed in Dahomey.
- 1861: Last recorded case of human sacrifice of Meriah among Khonds people in India.
- 1863: Igbo state of Abo accepted a treaty abolishing human sacrifice.
- 1867: Last human sacrifice was performed in Anaho in French Polinesia.
- 1868: Last recorded human sacrifice among Mayas in Chamula of Chiapas.
- 1869: The Alaska Times newspaper reported continued attempts at killing slaves during funerals of important people among Tlingit people in Alaska despite General Davis prohibiting such practice.
- 1874: Treaty imposed on Asante by British expedition aimed to abolish human sacrifice.
- 1876: Following the treaty Asante limited ritual killings to convicted murderers.
- 1877: Following death of Jung Bahadur Rana, three of his wives burnt themselves.
- April or May 1877: Last royal-sponsored human sacrifise in Cambodia in Ba Phnom.
- 1879: Following the death of Mataka I Nyambi, king of Yao dynasty region in modern northern Mozambique, 30 boys and 30 girls were sacrificed at this funeral.
- 1880: S. Hall Young's autobiography includes a second-hand account of human sacrifice of a slave performed during a funeral of a native chief in Wrangell, Alaska. This is last recorded human sacrifice in Alaska.
- 1880s: Italian explorer Antonio Cecchi claimed human sacrifices were performed in the kingdom of Yamma, however this claim was not made based on eyewitness account. Similar claim was made 40 years earlier by William Cornwallis Harris.
- 1881: Asante abolished public executions at religious ceremonies.
- 1883: Charles Morris Woodford claimed a second-hand account of a sacrifice of a boy on the Roviana region in the Solomon Islands.
- 1885/6: When king of Kuba Bope Mobinji died over 2,000 people were sacrifices, including wives and slaves buried with him.
- 1887:
  - the last human sacrifice in connection with a funeral among Yombe people occurred when nine women were buried with their dead husband.
  - Last recorded human sacrifice at Mount Tláloc in Mexico.
- 1890: Last human sacrifice occurred in Baliy area in Sarawak.
- 1892:
  - French conquest suppressed human sacrifises in Dahomey.
  - More than one thousand people were reportedly sacrificed during a funeral of mother of the king of Kuba people in Congo.
- 1890s:
  - Europeans conquered Benin and Asaba banning human sacrifice.
  - Funeral sacrifices of wives of chefs and witches stopped among Mapuche tribes in Argentina following state conquest of their territory.
- July 1893: Last human sacrifise in Ondo region in Nigeria took place when two slaves were killed at Oyegbata's funeral. After that British forced the region to stop the practice.
- 1895: First recorded ritual killing for medicine in British Lesotho.
- 1900: Last royal sacrifice occurred among Kuba people in Congo.

== 20th century ==
- 1903: In the last case of human sacrifice on Bali island in Indonesia two women were killed in Tabanan.
- c. 1904: According to Dennis Steley two older men told him they witnessed the last human sacrifice on the Ramata Island of a three-year old baby.
- 1909: Ritual sacrifice of a boy by elders was reported in Philippines. The perpetrators' sentences were suspended upon promise of ending the practice.
- 1911: The last ritual sacrifices with death of Chitimukulu in Zambia occurred.
- 1912: A Kazakh chief was skinned to make a religious implement by Ja Lama, who also cut the chief's heart out of his chest. Another Kazakh was also skinned.
- 1915:
  - Human sacrifices were reportedly still performed in Kamuku territory in Nigeria.
  - German officer claimed that during the coronation of Mwambutsa IV of Burundi human sacrifices were performed.
- 8 July 1920: Ritual burning of widows was fully banned in Nepal.
- 1922: A little girl was killed in a human sacrifice in colonial Uganda to appease rain deity Mayembe.
- 1923: In Chigango's Kraal in Rhodesia son of local chief was sacrificed to appease rain goddess. Two people were found guilty and sentenced to death.
- 1925: Duna boy was killed by Huli tribe in Papua New Guinea in a human sacrifice ritual.
- 1927–8: British forces sent several expeditions into upper Myanmar convincing local chiefs to stop human sacrifice.
- January 1929: Last pre-World War 2 human sacrifice in Upper Burma is recorded in Manmao village.
- 1930: According to an unverified report of a local man, last human sacrifice was offered on the island of Sumba in Indonesia. The practice was known to occur at least until the Dutch conquest in 1900s.
- 1931: Government of Assam sentenced all adult members of villages near Burma border engaged in human sacrifise to punitive labor.
- 4 December 1933: Khanty tribe ritually sacrificed a group of Soviet soldiers. It is the only known case of human sacrifice among the group.
- 1940–5: Last reported cases of human sacrifice among Hadjarai people in Chad.
- 1946: During raids by villagers from Naga hills in Myanmar a number of slaves were taken, with some of them later being sold for human sacrifice. This is last record of human sacrifice in Myanmar recorded by British administration.
- 1945: Young girl was ritually killed in Elmina in Ghana. Five men were convicted and hanged.
- 1949: Two chiefs were hanged in British Lesotho for ritual killings of people for medicine.
- 1950: A boy was sacrificed during construction of a house of local chief in colonial Uganda. The chief was convicted but acquitted on appeal.
- 1960: In the aftermath of the 1960 Valdivia earthquake in Chile, a 5-year-old boy is sacrificed by a local Maluchem tribe. Two accused were released from prison after two years.
- 1966: Last reported ritual killing for medicine in Lesotho.
- 1976–7: A series of ritual killings dubbed the Maryland ritual killings occurred in Liberia. Seven of the alleged perpetrators were executed.
- 1971: Head of cargo cult in the East Sepik District in New Guinea threatened to sacrifice a boy.
- 1972: Last beheading during head hunting reportedly occurred among Ingolots of New Guinea.
- 1973: Ivory Coast army captain Sio Koulahou was arrested after allegedly kidnapping and killing five Mauritanian fishermen following an advice of a sorcerer to ensure success of his coup attempt.
- 1975: Last human sacrifice in Mayong village in Assam occurred.
- 1987:
  - India strengthened penalties against ritual burning of widows via Sati (Prevention) Act, 1987.
  - According to a second-hand account, last human sacrifice was performed at the Bujagali Falls in Uganda.
- 1989–97: During the First Liberian Civil War General Butt Naked engaged in multiple human sacrifices.

=== 1990s ===
- 1990: 30 people were arrested following ritual killing of a woman by cult in Gabon.
- 1991–2001: Kamajors militias are accused of engaging in human sacrifices during the Sierra Leone Civil War.
- 1996: A nine-year-old boy was sacrificed by Jharkhand-native Sushil Murmu as an offering to goddess Kali. Murmu was sentenced to death by the court but later got commuted to life imprisonment by the president of India.

== 21st century ==
- 2007: Papua New Guinea police clashed with human sacrifice cult after alleged kidnapping of a child. Villagers forced police to retreat with guns and arrows and went on rampage killing one man from other tribe.
- 2008: 13 year-old boy was ritually killed in Gabon. In total there were 12 ritual murders in previous month ahead of presidential elections.
- 2012: Ethiopian Karo tribe agreed to stop mingi practice of ritual killings of infants, however two tribes continue this practice.
- 2013: Steven Tari, the leader of a Papua New Guinea cult responsible for sacrifices of several girls, was killed by an angry mob.
- 2015: 10-year-old was sacrificed in Kudiya village in southwest Nepal. 11 people were convicted of murder.
- 2019: Aime Ngbando, Anti-balaka general from Satema ritually killed a 14-year-old girl to increase profit from mines.
- 2021: Uganda introduced a law prescribing death penalty for human sacrifice, advocating it or possessing body parts.
- 2022: Between June and October 2022, two women were killed and reportedly cannibalised as part of a human sacrifice in Elanthoor in Pathanamthitta district of Kerala. In October 2022, a six-year-old girl was killed in Delhi by two men to please a deity.
- 2024: Russian Rusich Group had sacrificed a Chechen Akhmat fighter in a ritual and recorded themselves mutilating him.
- 2020's: United States accusations of alleged ritual human sacrifice among the elite resurfaced after the US Department of Justice released files pertaining to an investigation into New York financier Jeffrey Epstein. Many of the files reference cannibalism and accuse the financier and his inner circle of engaging in rituals involving human sacrifice.

== See also ==
- Ancient Civilizations Forum (ACF)
