= Conserve (NGO) =

Indian non-governmental organization

Conserve is a non-governmental organization (NGO) launched in India in 1998 by husband and wife Shalabh and Anita Ahuja.

== Inception ==
In 1998, when the Delhi government launched the Bhagidari campaign, asking its citizens to participate in civic initiatives, the conservationist, Anita Ahuja and her IIT-alumna husband Shalabh rose to the challenge and launched Conserve. With a seed grant from the United States Agency for International Development (USAID), the duo began advocating waste management through seminars and workshops.

Conserve started in the living room of some of Anita Ahuja's friends who were taking up issues like sewage and garbage. In synergy with the local Resident Welfare Associations (RWA), the Ahujas would also collect the waste of several colonies in a park and then segregate it. Wet kitchen waste would be converted into compost while dry refuse like polythene bags would be put aside. That project did not quite work but led her to the idea of doing something about plastic bags.

Over the next two years Ahuja experimented with recycling the bags. She tried weaving them together to create a tarpaulin-like covering for the shacks of slum dwellers. Another time she tried pasting pieces of the polyethylene onto canvas and cardboard. She saw that a thicker fabric could be used to make bric-a-brac like pen holders and file folders, and realized she'd finally found a successful recipe when her homemade products were popular at a fair at the U.S. embassy in New Delhi. She decided to venture into accessories.

Ahuja’s project has created employment for scores of underprivileged people and also become a solution for solving the problem of plastic waste. The range has now been extended to creating footwear, cushions, jewellery, lamps, boxes and books.

Recognition

In August 2018 Power Brands awarded Anita Ahuja the Bharatiya Manavata Vikas Puraskar for her efforts to protect our planet and all forms of life in it through her innovation – "handmade recycled plastic" – which will not only stall our hurtling march towards an "environmental holocaust", but also make plastics a high end fashion material.
