= Darbara Singh (disambiguation) =

Darbara Singh was an Indian politician, chief minister of Punjab, India.

Darbara Singh may also refer to:

- Darbara Singh (murderer), Indian serial killer
- Darbara Singh (speaker), Indian politician
- Darbara Singh Guru, Indian politician
- Baba Darbara Singh, Jathedar
