= Seema Gavit and Renuka Shinde =

Indian serial killers (1990–1996)

Seema Gavit
- Born: Seema Mohan Gavit; 1975 (age 50–51); Pune, Maharashtra, India
- Convictions: Murder, kidnapping
- Penalty: Death; commuted to life imprisonment

Details
- Victims: 5 (murder); 13 (kidnapping)
- Span of crimes: 1990–1996
- Country: India
- State: Maharashtra
- Date apprehended: November 1996

Renuka Shinde
- Born: 1973 (age 52–53); Pune, Maharashtra, India
- Convictions: Murder, Kidnapping
- Penalty: Death; commuted to life imprisonment

Details
- Victims: 5 (murder); 13 (kidnapping)
- Span of crimes: 1990–1996
- Country: India
- State: Maharashtra
- Date apprehended: November 1996

Sisters Seema Mohan Gavit (born 1975) and Renuka Kiran Shinde (born 1973) are Indian serial killers convicted of kidnapping thirteen children and killing five of them between 1990 and 1996. In association with their mother Anjanabai, they were active in various cities in western Maharashtra – Pune, Thane, Kalyan, Kolhapur, and Nashik. The reason for kidnapping the children was to take them to crowded places where one of the trio would try to steal people's belongings. If the thief was caught, she would either try to evoke sympathy through the child, or create a distraction by hurting them. The kidnapped child would later be killed.

The trio were arrested in November 1996, along with Renuka's husband Kiran Shinde, who later turned approver and was pardoned. Anjanabai died of illness within two years of being arrested, with the trial yet to begin. In 2001, the Sessions Court at Kolhapur found the sisters guilty of kidnapping thirteen and murdering six children. The Bombay High Court in 2004 upheld the conviction but acquitted them of one murder. The death sentence handed down by these courts was confirmed by the Supreme Court in 2006. After this ruling, Seema and Renuka filed mercy petitions in 2008 and 2009, respectively, which were rejected by President Pranab Mukherjee in 2014. Because of this delay in seeking a decision on their mercy petitions, the Bombay High Court ultimately commuted their death sentence to life imprisonment in 2022. The sisters currently remain lodged at Yerwada Jail in Pune. Had their original sentences been carried out, the sisters would have been the first women to be executed in India since 1955, and only the second overall.

== Early life and crimes ==
Hailing from Nashik, Anjanabai had fled to Pune with a truck driver, who deserted her soon after Renuka was born in 1973. Mother and daughter most probably survived by stealing. Anjanabai later married Mohan Gavit, a retired soldier, following which Seema was born in 1975. However, Anjanabai's history of crime, mostly petty thefts and pickpocketing, resulted in repeated police harassment. Mohan Gavit ultimately abandoned his wife and daughter and remarried. The trio continued stealing, with the younger daughter sometimes being used as bait. Elder sister Renuka got married in 1989 to Kiran Shinde, a tailor working in Pune, at a temple near Shirdi.

== Kidnappings and murders ==
In 1990, a theft attempt at the Chaturshringi Temple in Pune went awry, and Renuka was caught. She, however, managed to free herself by using her toddler son whom she had taken with her, arguing that a mother with a small child cannot steal. The crowd let her go, and Renuka shared this incident with her mother and sister. It was then that the family decided to conduct these thefts with small children in tow, with the children serving both as a foil and a distraction to help them escape easily.

Between 1990 and 1996, the family kidnapped an estimated 40 or more children, mostly from crowded places such as temple compounds and fairgrounds in Pune, Thane, Kalyan, Kolhapur, and Nashik; they would ultimately be charged with 13 kidnappings (mostly children below five years of age) and 10 murders. While missing children reports were filed in some cases, many of the kidnappings likely went unreported as the children came from poor families and the police did not pay heed. Kiran Shinde would drive the getaway car in the kidnappings.

Their first murder victim was the son of a beggar in Kolhapur who was picked up by Renuka in July 1990. They brought him to Pune and named him Santosh. In April 1991, they took him to Kolhapur, where Seema was caught while trying to steal the purse of a devotee at the Mahalaxmi temple. To divert attention away from Seema, Anjanabai threw Santosh down with force. Barely a year old at the time, he sustained injuries. In the melee that ensued, Seema managed to escape. As the bleeding Santosh kept crying, the family became worried of getting caught. To silence him, Anjanabai bashed his head against an electric pole, with the others reportedly "witnessing the killer eating vada-pav". Santosh died on the spot, and they disposed of his body near an old rickshaw heap.

The children were mostly killed when they wouldn't stop crying, with post-mortems indicating injuries from being thrown downstairs or hit repeatedly. In one instance, they killed a two-and-half-year-old girl, stuffed her body in a bag and took it to a cinema hall, where they watched a film and later dumped the body on the way home. A two-year-old boy was hanged upside down, and his head was slammed repeatedly against the wall. At no point, the prosecution claimed, did the accused show any concern or remorse.

== Arrest and trial ==
In October 1996, a police complaint was filed in Nashik against the trio by Pratibha, the second wife of Anjanabai's former husband Mohan Gavit. It alleged that they had kidnapped Pratibha's nine-year-old daughter Kranti. The child was killed and her body dumped in a sugarcane field at Narsoba near Pune.

As the investigation began, the family went underground, but the police arrested them on 19 November as they reappeared and tried to kidnap Pratibha and Mohan's younger daughter. A search team sent to their house in Nashik uncovered evidence of more kidnappings such as discarded clothing of children.

Investigators found all three as being particularly obstinate witnesses, especially the mother Anjanabai. Ultimately, it was Seema who admitted to the kidnapping and killing of Kranti, but she said it was all done under her mother's orders. The trio would later be charged with Kranti's kidnapping and murder, but not convicted.

Within two years of the arrest, and before the trial had begun, Anjanabai died of illness, aged about 50.

The prosecution examined 156 witnesses during the trial. Its case was strengthened after Kiran Shinde, Renuka's husband who had also been arrested, turned approver. He provided details of how the crimes were committed and bodies disposed of, and of the roles played by Anjanabai, Renuka and Seema. For his co-operation, he was pardoned by the court.

In the Sessions Court at Kolhapur, the sisters were ultimately charged with thirteen kidnappings and ten murders. On 29 June 2001, the court found the sisters guilty of all kidnappings, but only six murders, citing a lack of evidence in the other four. The Bombay High Court upheld the conviction in its ruling on 9 September 2004 but acquitted them of one murder. The death sentence handed down by these courts was confirmed by the Supreme Court on 31 August 2006.

== Mercy pleas and commutation of sentence ==
The Constitution of India, empowers the President to grant pardon under Article 72. A parallel power is given to the Governor of a state under Article 161 of the Constitution. After the Supreme Court's ruling, Seema and Renuka filed mercy petitions on 10 October 2008 and 17 October 2009, respectively. The mercy petitions made to the Governor of Maharashtra were rejected in March 2012 and August 2013. The application was then forwarded to President Pranab Mukherjee, who rejected both petitions in July 2014.

Rejection of their pleas prompted the sisters to approach the Bombay High Court on 19 August 2014, seeking commutation of their death sentence on the ground that the state had taken an inordinate time causing an unexplained delay in seeking their mercy plea. They contended that the President took more than five years to reject their mercy petitions when such a plea should have been disposed of within three months, and this had forced them to live under the constant fear of death. The affidavits filed in reply by the Union Home Ministry and the Maharashtra home department sought to shift blame from themselves. The central government claimed that it had sent a series of urgent reminders to the state government to look into the matter, including in April 2012 when it sought information from the state on the mercy petitions. The Maharashtra home department maintained that there was no unreasonable delay on part of the state, that the time elapsed was a result of following the required procedure at each level, and that the file on their mercy petitions had to be reconstructed after it was destroyed in a June 2012 fire at its headquarters, the Mantralaya.

Delivering its judgement on 18 January 2022, the High Court commuted their death sentence to life imprisonment on account of the state's "gross and unexplained delay" in seeking a decision on their mercy petitions, noting how such a delay had "a dehumanizing effect" on the convicts. The verdict highlighted that "the neglect and indifference" of the officers of the state government had forced the commutation. The judges also stated that the sisters' crimes were "heinous", that they were "a menace to society", and thus they will remain lodged at Pune's Yerwada Jail for the rest of their natural lives. Had their original sentences been carried out, the sisters would have been the first women to be executed in India since 1955, and only the second overall, after Rattan Bai Jain was executed for killing three girls.

== In popular culture ==
In 2019 the case was included as one of the cases in the true-crime bestselling book The Deadly Dozen: India's Most Notorious Serial Killers by Anirban Bhattacharyya, the creator-producer of the hit TV show Savdhaan India.

The 2019 Hindi film Posham Pa was based on the lives and crimes of the family.

== See also ==
- List of serial killers by country
