= Yaana (company) =

Public Bicycle Sharing (PBS) service

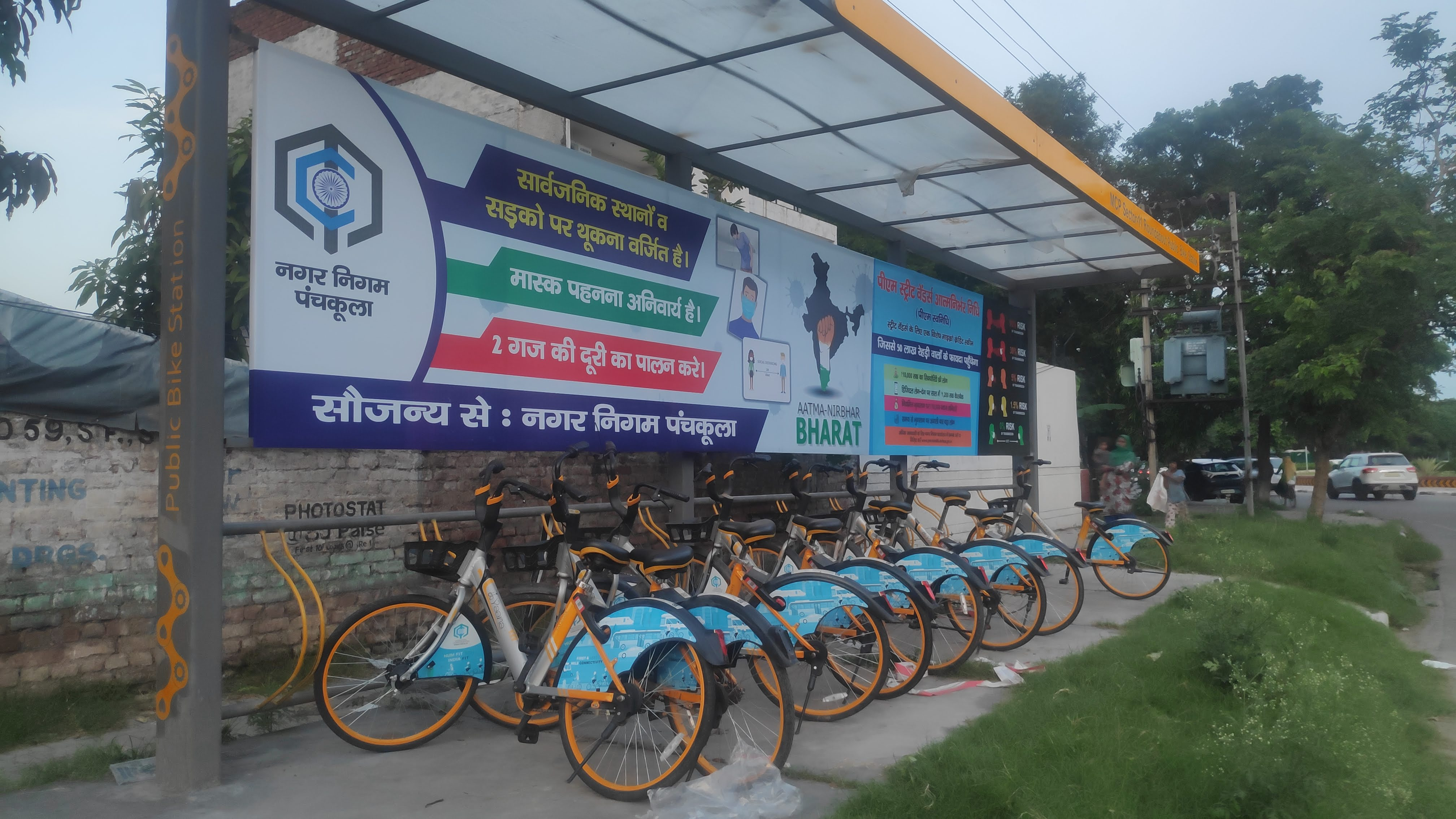
Public Bicycle Sharing (PBS) service Panchkula, India

Yaana is an app based Public Bicycle Sharing (PBS) service (Under the Smart City Project) panchkula, inaugurated on Wednesday 21 Aug 2019 by Manohar Lal Khattar, Chief Minister, Haryana.

The system is provided by "Yaana Smart Technologies Pvt. Ltd." based at Koppal, Karnataka.

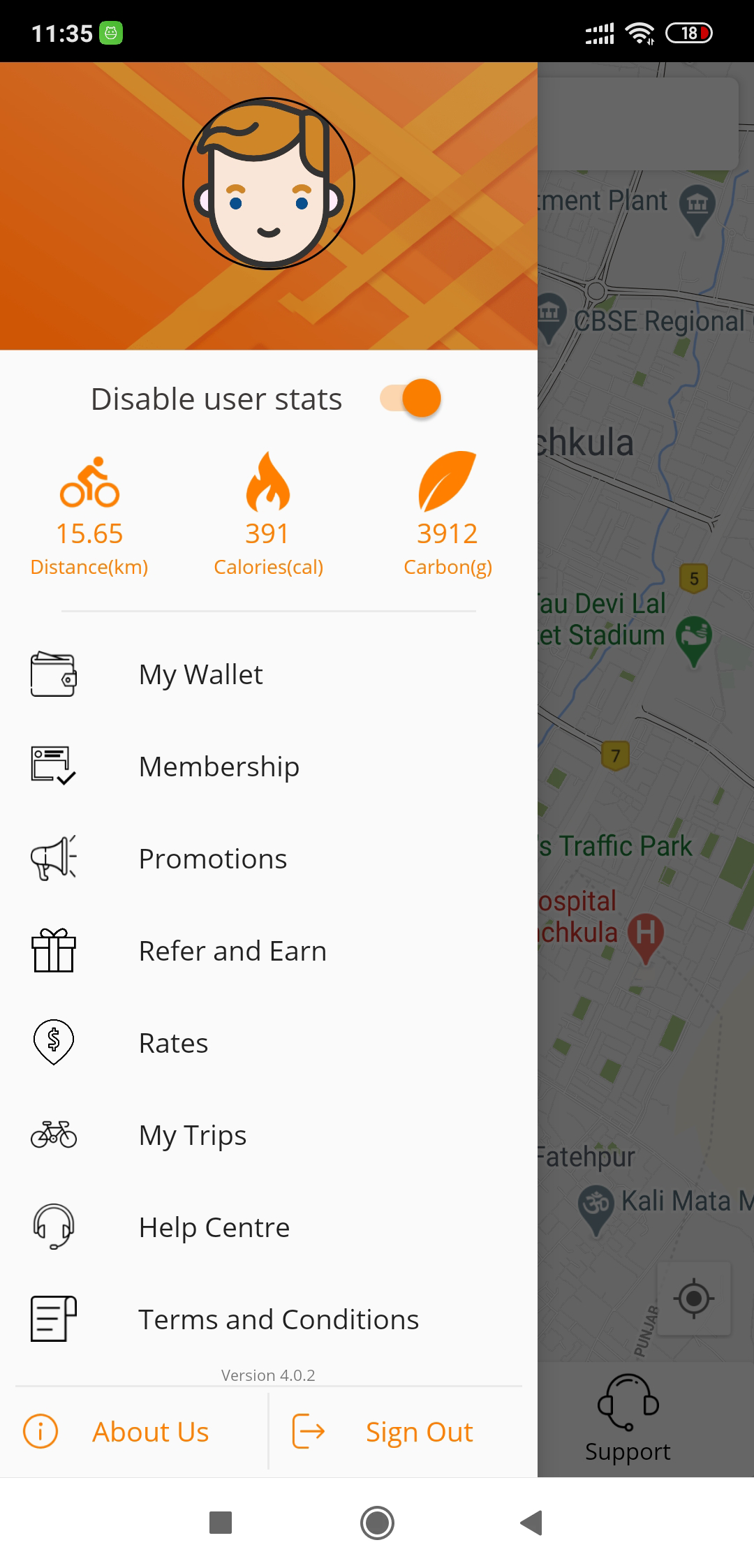
Public Bicycle Sharing app UI Panchkula, India

== Residents ==
There will be 20 different dock stations in Panchkula. Residents can rent a bicycle Rs 100 is the initial security deposit. The ride is Rs 5 per 30 minutes, so the remaining amount can be used for later rides. There are Cashless transactions through mobile apps and smart locks. It will be controlled by Android and iOS yaana applications.

== Features ==
- All bicycles will have a Global Positioning System (GPS) tracking.
- It tells the distance covered and the calories burnt by a rider.
- The bikes can be picked up from and dropped of at any bike station
- The app tells you the distance you can cover, and the calories you burn

== Gallery ==
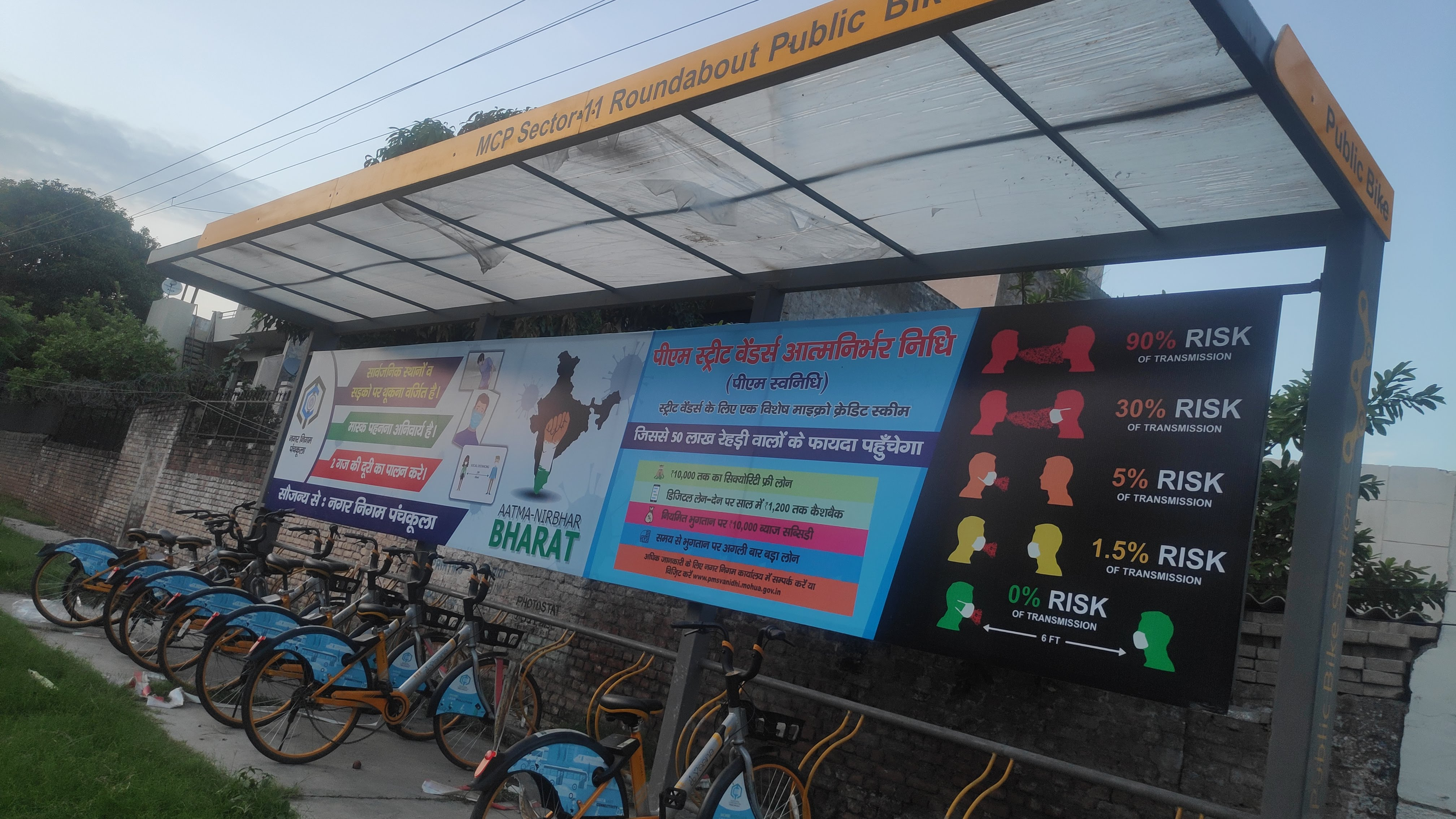

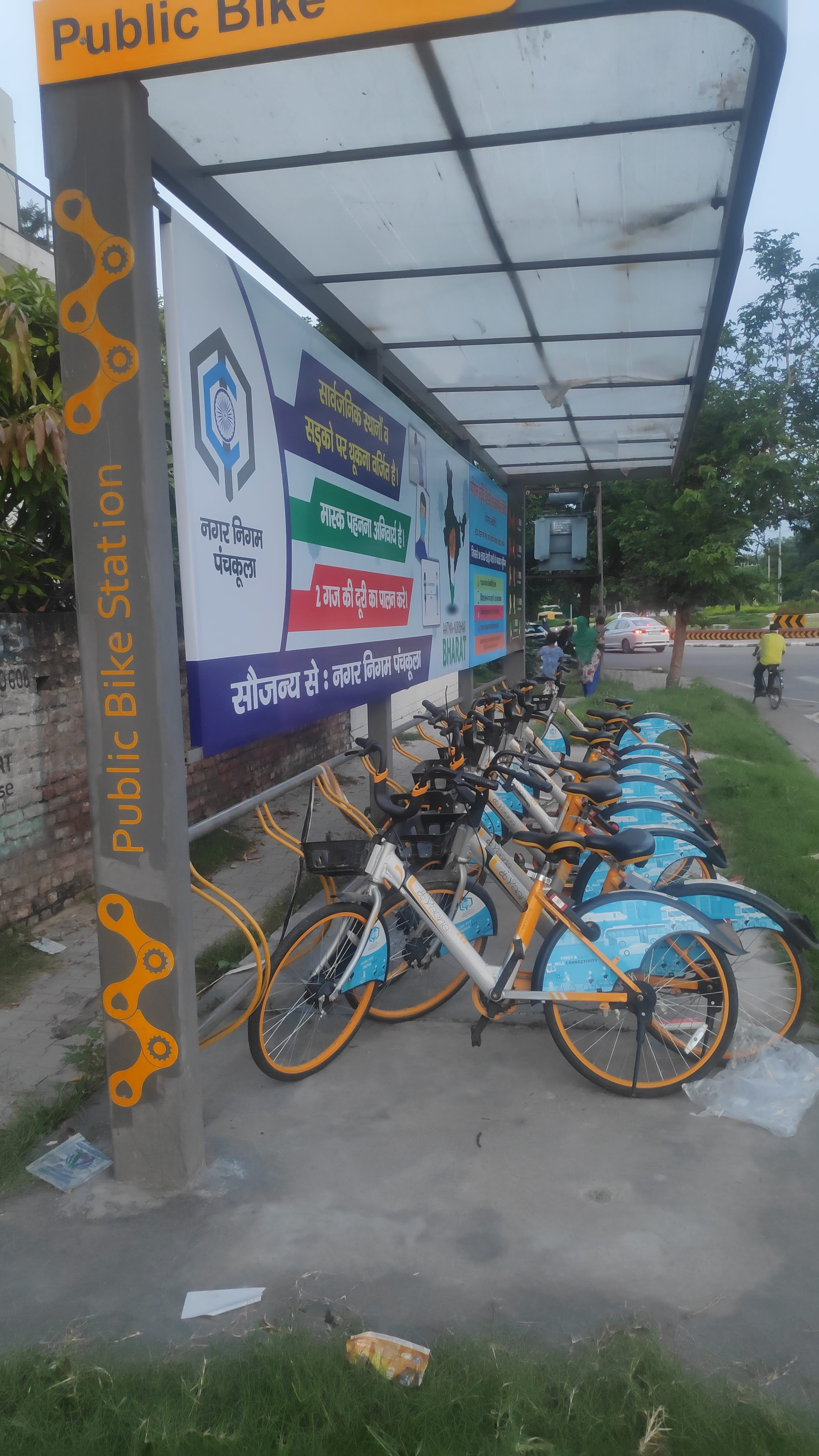

== Timings ==
The duration for riding is 14 hours, bicycles will function from 6 AM to 8 PM. A Central Control System set up for this purpose will monitor them in real-time.

== Installations ==
As per installation and operation of the system were allotted to M/S Dharani Enterprises. The contract was for three years.

== Revenue ==
As per the project, it will generate revenue by giving rights to service providers to sell advertisement space on docking stations. However, this will be permissible on 40% of stations i.e. eight out of twenty.

== Use of Smart cards ==
Some resident welfare associations (RWAs) demanded the facility as children and senior citizens without smartphones were unable to use the service

The smart cards have been introduced at an initial cost of ₹100. Later, users will have to pay as per different price slabs of ₹250, ₹500 and ₹1,000. People can get smart cards from the MC’s citizen facilitation centre in Sector 4. Before this, the Yaana app users have to scan the QR Code on a bicycle from their smartphones to open its lock.
