= Darbara Singh (murderer) =

Indian serial killer

- Born: Darbara Singh; 1952; Jallupur Khera, Amritsar district, Punjab, India
- Died: 6 June 2018 (age 65-66); Patiala Central Jail, Patiala, Punjab, India
- Status: Deceased
- Convictions: Murder, Rape
- Penalty: Life Imprisonment

Details
- Victims: 2 confirmed, 17–23 suspected
- Span of crimes: April – October 2004
- Country: India

Darbara Singh (1952 – 6 June 2018) was an Indian serial killer who was convicted of two murders.

During April–October 2004, 23 children of non-Punjabi migrants were kidnapped in the Jalandhar city of Punjab, India. Many of these children were sexually assaulted, and 17 of them were killed. In October, the police apprehended Darbara Singh, who had earlier been jailed for nearly a decade in another case involving sexual assault and attempted murder of a child. Singh allegedly confessed that he was behind all these abductions, sexual assaults and murders in 2004. He was convicted of two of the murders, and sentenced to life in prison. He was also convicted of two more murders; in this case, he had led the police to dead bodies after his arrest. He was given a death sentence in this case, but was later acquitted by the High Court because of insufficient evidence. He was also acquitted in four more cases because of insufficient evidence. He died in 2018, while serving a life sentence, with some of the cases pending trial.

== Early life ==
Darbara Singh was a native of Jallupur Khera village of Amritsar district. He joined the Indian Armed Forces, and was posted at the Air Force Station at Pathankot. In 1975, he was accused of lobbing a hand grenade at the house of his senior officer Major V K Sharma, after having an altercation with him. The wife and teenage son of the officer were seriously injured in the attack. Singh was dismissed and arrested; however, he was acquitted after a trial. Singh had three children; his wife expelled him from their house, because of his "bad habits".

In 1996, Darbara Singh raped and attempted to murder the daughter of a migrant labourer in Kapurthala. In 1997, he was convicted in three cases of rape and attempted murder, and sentenced to prison for thirty years. From Kapurthala he was shifted to the Jalandhar Central Jail, and then to the Ludhiana Central Jail. On 3 December 2003, his mercy petition was accepted on the basis of his good conduct, and he was released from jail. By this time, he had developed a grudge against migrants, holding them responsible for wasting many years of his life.

After his release, he came to Jalandhar, where he started working in a factory in the Leather Complex area. He lived in a rented room in the Model House locality. To take his 'revenge' against the migrants, he started targeting their children.

== Modus operandi ==
Singh lured his victims with sweets, samosas, sugarcane juice, and crackers. He took them to a secluded place, where he would attack the victim. In most cases, he slit their throat and attempted to rape their dead bodies. After his arrest, he said that he raped the dead bodies so that "there would be no shrieks of victims".

His preferred time to kidnap the children was between 10 am and 12:30 pm when most of the migrant labourers were away in factories.

After his arrest, he said that he was not drunk at the time of committing crimes, but afterwards, "celebrated almost each of the killings with liquor and good food".

== Alleged victims ==
During a period of 7 months, 23 children, most of them below the age of 10, went missing from Kapurthala city. Out of 23, six were recovered by the police. Darbara Singh admitted that he had killed the other 17 victims, including 15 girls and 2 boys. He subjected many of the dead bodies to rape or sodomy. He said that he had dumped most of the bodies near a bridge on the Rayya-Khadoor Sahib road.

Singh targeted children of non-Punjabi migrants. He killed one Punjabi girl by mistake, and after his arrest, said that he had been "shaken" by her death.

Suspected victims of Darbara Singh
Name	Gender	Age	Residence	Date of disappearance	Status	Note
Satish	M	6	Model Town Jalandhar	18 April 2004	Killed	
Gudia	F	10	Model Town Jalandhar	18 April 2004	Killed	Sister of Satish
Shankar	M	8	GTB Nagar	18 April 2004	Escaped	Abducted along Gudia and Satish
Diksha alias Tolu	F	8	Rasta Mohalla	18 April 2004	Killed	
Asha alias Ashu	F	6	Rasta Mohalla	18 April 2004	Escaped	Fled while Darbara Singh was assaulting her sister Diksha.
Jatinder	M	9	Leather Complex	17 June 2004	Killed	
Ravina	F	4	Shastri Nagar	29 June 2004	Saved	
Patal Kumari	F	?	Basti Bawa Khel	29 June 2004	Saved	
Poonam	F	7	Basti Peerdaad	6 August 2004	Killed	
Lacchmi	F	5	Basti Shiekh	15 August 2004	Killed	
Laloo Parsaad	M	6	Leather Complex	16 August 2004	Killed	Darbara Singh dumped Laloo's naked body in Shah Changi village, and led police to the spot after his arrest.
Nitika	F	3	Basti Danishmandan	16 August 2004	Saved	
Rajesh Kumar	M	5	Basti Bawa Khel	16 August 2004	Saved	
Tazbin	F	10	Avtaar Nagar	22 August 2004	Killed	
Mumtaaz	F	?	Avtaar Nagar	22 August 2004	Escaped	Sister of Tazbin
Sanju Kumar	M	5	Basti Shiekh	24 August 2004	Killed	
Rajesh Kumar	M	7	Leather Complex	28 August 2004	Killed	Found naked and sexually assaulted
Geeta	F	5	Leather Complex	28 August 2004	Killed	Sister of Rajesh, found clothed
Nishu	F	7	Urban Estate Phase II	18 October 2004	Escaped	
Rani	F	9	Jallowal Colony	22 October 2004	Killed	Killed in Nakodar
Khursheed	M	5	Basti Mithu	25 October 2004	Killed	Sexually assaulted
Ronku	F	6	Basti Mithu	25 October 2004	Killed	Cousin of Khursheed, sexually assaulted
Puja	F	8	?	?	Killed	Found clothed
Deepak	M	8	?	?	Killed	Brother of Puja, found naked
Amrit	M	5	Leather Complex	?	Killed	
Karu	F	?	Leather Complex	?	Killed	Sister of Amrit

The police believe that he may have more victims. A September 2004 report in The Tribune also named the following missing children, believed to have been abducted by the suspected bicyclist:

#	Name	Gender	Age	Residence
1	Manju	F	8	Ram Lila Grounds
2	Lashki	F	8	Basti Sheikh
3	Bittu	M	7	Nari Niketan area
4	Vikas alias Mani	M	13	Bhargo Nagar
5	Lashmi	F	9	Ram Nagar
6	Bisjeet (brother of Lashmi)	M	8	Ram Nagar

Some of the above-mentioned cases are described in detail below:

On 18 April 2004, Diksha and her sister Asha were playing with their two cousins at Company Bagh. There, Darbara Singh promised to buy them a shuttlecock and a racket, and took them to the bank of a canal near Rayyia. There, he made Asha sit on one side of the canal. He took Diksha behind the bushes and raped her. A frightened Asha ran away from the place, while Diksha was killed. Meanwhile, when the two girls did not return for a long time, their cousins returned home and informed the family. The family searched for the girls and then registered a missing persons complaint. Later, a man named Malkiat Singh found Asha in Fazilpur village in Tarn Taran district. He gave her biscuits and medicines and then brought her to the Khadoor Sahib police station. The police control room then informed the Jalandhar police station that a girl named Ashu had been found in Tarn Taran. Later, the police found Diksha's naked dead body lying on a big stone near Bahadurpur Uppal canal. A post-mortem conducted on 21 April revealed that she had died because of "neurogenic shock as a result of injuries to private part".

On 22 August 2004, Tazbin and her sister Mumtaz were playing outside, when Darbara enticed them with some sweets and an empty bottle. Singh told them that they could fetch good money by selling the bottle. He then seated both the girls on his bicycle, but Mumtaaz refused to go along. After a week, Tazbin's body was found in bushes in Chaheru village on the Jalandhar-Phagwara Road. The body was found lying in a mutilated condition. She had been sexually assaulted. The police had to declare the body as unclaimed and it was accordingly cremated at Phagwara.

On 18 October 2004, Nishu was playing with other children in front of her house, when she went missing. Her father registered a missing person complaint on 19 October. The same morning, Bhana Ram and Gurdev Singh found Nishu near a sugarcane field in Mahadipur village. She was severely injured: her windpipe in the throat was cut, and she could not speak. Gurdev Singh informed the police, who admitted the girl to PGI Chandigarh. After Singh's arrest, she identified him from his pictures in newspapers and testified against him in court.

On 25 October 2004, Darbara Singh killed Khursheed, the son of a migrant from Darbhanga district, Bihar. Khursheed and his cousin Ronku were playing near their house, in the afternoon. When they did not return home, the family searched for them for two days, and then registered a missing persons complaint. After his arrest, Singh led the police to a place near Kadianwali village, from where the police recovered the bodies of Khursheed and his cousin Ronku. The post-mortem showed that both Khursheed and Roku had been sexually assaulted: there were ruptures on their private parts. While the body of Khursheed had clothes on, Ronku's body was naked and his throat had been slit. Singh was acquitted in the case because of insufficient evidence.

== Arrest ==
By September 2004, panic had spread among the local residents. In the preceding 4 months, 14 children had been kidnapped with no ransom demands, and 10 of them were still missing. The chopped arm of a child was found near Variana, and the partly decomposed body of a 10-year-old girl was found in Chaheru. The police were looking for a middle-aged bicyclist who was likely mentally challenged.

A Special Investigation Team (SIT) analyzed the killer's modus operandi and prepared his sketch based on information gathered from different sources. On the morning of 29 October 2004, the police received information about a bicyclist, who resembled the sketch and was seen with a bag of toffees. SHO Pritam Singh was despatched to nab the person, who turned out to be Darbara Singh. When the police party intercepted him near Bastian, Singh threw away his bicycle and tried to run away. The police apprehended and questioned him, following which he confessed his crimes.

According to the police, Darbara confessed to having targeted 23 children, out of whom he killed 17. However, the police suspect that the actual number of victims could be more. Their suspicion was based on similar abductions in Kapurthala district and the recovery of two more mutilated bodies of babies in the jungles of Jallupur Khera village of Amritsar district.

Nishu, who had escaped from his clutches on 22 October, identified him from his pictures in newspapers. Ilaqa Magistrate K.K. Kareer remanded him in 10 days' police custody. After his medical examination and court appearance, Darbara Singh led the police to a place near Kadianwali village. There, the police found the bodies of two victims, Khursheed and Ronku, who had been killed on 25 October.

After his arrest, Darbara Singh showed no remorse, even when he was taken to the sites where he had dumped the dead bodies. He told the police that he could have killed more children if he had not been arrested "so soon". He said that he had no remorse for killing the children of migrant labourers, as they were instrumental in sending him to jail. He also added that he targeted a Punjabi girl by mistake, and had to kill her because "she could have created problems" for him; he said that he was "a bit shaken" by this. He contradicted himself, by first saying, "I still think whatever I did was right and it was the demand of the time", but then adding "I think what was done by me was wrong and I promise that I would never do it again."

== Convictions and acquittals ==
After his arrest, Darbara Singh was charged with 18 cases of abduction, rape and murder. By the end of 2007, he was acquitted in three of these cases due to lack of sufficient evidence.

On 7 January 2008, Judge Iqbal Singh Bajwa gave him a death sentence for the murders of Khursheed and Ronku in 2004. On 9 January, he was shifted from Jalandhar jail to the Patiala Central Jail for hanging.

In April 2008, Singh was tried for raping and killing 8-year-old Diskha on 18 April 2004. Her sister Asha and her two cousins identified Singh in the court. Singh's counsel claimed that he had been falsely implicated, and based his defence on the premise that the children were tutored witnesses. On 25 April 2008, Judge B.K Mehta of Jalandhar court sentenced him to life imprisonment.

On 30 July 2009, Justice Mehtab Singh Gill and Justice Jitendra Chauhan of the Punjab and Haryana High Court reversed the death sentence given to Darbara Singh for the murders of Khursheed and Ronku. Citing insufficient evidence, the Court acquitted Darbara Singh, giving the benefit of the doubt. The prosecution had presented Jathedar Pritam Singh as a witness. Pritam claimed that he had recognized Darbara Singh at a police checkpost on 29 October 2004, leading to the latter's arrest. He also claimed to have seen Darbara Singh taking the two children away from Basti Mithu on a bicycle, on 25 October. Pritam stated that he was going towards Basti Mithu at the time. Once he reached Basti Mithu, he came to learn that two children were missing from the area. He then rushed to the place where he had seen Darbara earlier but did not find him or the children there. Although this incident happened on 25 October 2004, he did not report it to the police until 28 October. This was despite the fact that he was a member of Akali Dal's working committee, and was well aware of the child abduction incidents happening in the area. The Court, therefore, ruled him out as a "planted witness". The prosecution had also presented Darbara Singh's fingerprints on a liquor bottle and glass, stating that these two objects had been recovered from the place where the dead bodies were found. In support, the prosecution had presented the testimonies of several policemen and the owner of the field where the bodies had been found. The Court pointed out that there was no mention of these objects in the inquest reports of Khursheed and Ronku. Besides, the police claimed to have recovered these objects on 30 October but sent them to the Forensic Science Laboratory only on 11 November. Therefore, the Court dismissed this piece of evidence, citing a 1997 Supreme Court judgment, which had ruled that the accused is entitled to acquittal if the fingerprints are kept in the police station for more than five days. The judge also questioned why the police had not taken any DNA or blood samples. He directed the police to adopt scientific methods instead of relying on "archaic methods of investigation". In February 2010, the Punjab government moved the Supreme Court, calling the High Court's decision as "wholly erroneous".

On 10 December 2010, Judge B.S. Sandhu acquitted him in the Tazbin rape and murder case, because of insufficient evidence.

Darbara Singh was also convicted of kidnapping and causing life-threatening injury to Nishu. Nishu could not speak because of the throat injury, but she used expressions to identify Darbara Singh as her kidnapper and attacker. Guddi, a neighbour of Nishu, also testified that she had seen Darbara Singh standing with his bicycle in the area where the children were playing. Another man, Sham Lal, testified that he had seen Darbara Singh taking a young girl on the carrier of his bicycle in Isharwal village. Singh appealed against the conviction in the High Court, but his appeal was rejected.

== Death ==
In 2018, Singh fell ill, and was moved from the prison to the Government Rajindra hospital in Patiala on 2 June. There, he died on 6 June; his family refused to claim his body, calling his crimes "unpardonable".

== See also ==
- List of serial killers by country
- The bestselling true-crime book The Deadly Dozen: India's Most Notorious Serial Killers by Anirban Bhattacharyya
