= Sector 36 =

2024 Indian film by Aditya Nimbalkar

- Official release poster
- Directed by: Aditya Nimbalkar
- Written by: Bodhayan Roychaudhury
- Produced by: Dinesh Vijan; Jyoti Deshpande
- Starring: Vikrant Massey; Deepak Dobriyal; Akash Khurana; Darshan Jariwala
- Cinematography: Saurabh Goswami
- Edited by: A. Sreekar Prasad
- Music by: Songs: OAFF—Savera; Dhunkey; Gourov Dasgupta; Kanishk Seth; Score: Ketan Sodha
- Production companies: Maddock Films; Jio Studios
- Distributed by: Netflix
- Release date: 13 September 2024
- Running time: 124 minutes
- Country: India
- Language: Hindi

Sector 36 is 2024 Indian Hindi-language crime thriller film directed by Aditya Nimbalkar and written by Bodhayan Roy Chaudhury. Produced by Maddock Films and Jio Studios, it stars Vikrant Massey, Deepak Dobriyal and Akash Khurana. It is loosely based on the 2006 Noida serial murders in Nithari Village. It premiered on Netflix on 13 September 2024 to mixed reviews from critics.

== Plot ==
The film opens up with Prem Singh, the house help of a wealthy and powerful businessman Balbir Bassi who is seen chopping a dead girl's corpse and the scene cuts to Sub Inspector (SI) Ram Charan Pandey who is a corrupt officer and is irritated with the daily cases of children missing from the nearby slum and stops registering FIR's as per the orders of his seniors.

One day, a rotten skeleton of a human hand is found in the drains of the slum. SI Ram Charan dismisses it by calling it an animal's hand and providing some money to the boy who discovered the hand. Later, Prem kidnaps the boy and chops his body into pieces after killing him. He has a friend, Chote Lal, with whom he runs a business of organ trafficking, and both of them share the money they earn from the business.

In a flashback, it is revealed that Prem was abused and raped by his butcher uncle daily. One day Prem kills and chops him into pieces, and eats him. Prem is addicted by human meat thereafter.

Bassi, residing in Karnal, visits his house in Delhi (which is guarded by Prem) and asks Prem to bring Chumki, a prostitute, home. Chumki is reported missing after that night, and SI Ram dismisses Chumki's father angrily after a conflict. That night, Prem tries to kidnap Ram Charan's daughter, but Ram Charan manages to save her, realising that the cases of missing children are real kidnappings.

A wealthy household's child is kidnapped, leading to a nationwide manhunt and the child being found in only two days, depicting how low-profile cases are not cared about, but when it's a high-profile case, everybody comes to action, exposing the dark reality of the system.

SI Ram Charan registers an FIR of Chumki's disappearance and reaches Bassi, who brushes off Chumki's father, saying he is a pimp of his daughter. This enrages Ram Charan, and he beats Chumki's father and asks him to leave. Ram Charan's senior officer warns him not to involve Bassi in any way in the case. He finds Chumki's mobile phone with the auto-driver, who had dropped her at Balbir's residence. He learns that Prem had given the mobile to the auto-driver to throw it off, but he didn't, and that Prem is directly involved in this case, leading to his temporary suspension for not following the orders of his senior.

After returning to duty, Ram Charan takes Chote Lal into custody, and he confesses that Prem had made Chumki disappear. His senior officer, Rastogi, now under pressure that Ram is near to the truth, bribes Ram's junior officer, Shravan Kumar Pathak, to hand over Chote Lal to assassins. When Ram Charan finds that Chote Lal is missing, he thrashes Pathak because his carelessness resulted in the disappearance of an important witness. He is calmed down by his senior officer. With the testimony provided by the auto-driver, Ram arrests Prem Singh and interrogates him. To his shock, Prem reveals everything-how he kidnaps kids, rapes them, and chops them off after killing them. He also reveals that he cannibalises some of the meat and does organ trafficking, and sends the money to his family. He admits to raping Chumki, killing her, and dismembering her because she refused his advances. This leaves Ram Charan and his senior in shock. They ask Prem about Bassi's involvement, but he refuses to answer. Ram Charan beats him and asks why he kidnapped, raped, and murdered those children. He says the poor children are of no use to society and their lives don't matter. Ram Charan arrests him, and finally, the truth is uncovered. It is reported that 24 minors were kidnapped, brutally assaulted, and killed in the residence of Bassi. This leads to Bassi being arrested. As more children's bodies are found, the public becomes outraged, and extra guards are brought in to prevent them from getting to Prem to kill him. Bassi responds to the allegations by blaming the crimes on Prem. As a result, Bassi is acquitted, but Ram decides to expose the truth about Bassi as well.

Ram Charan visits Prem in jail and tells him that the money he sent to his family actually never reached them. He then tells him that Bassi has blamed all the crimes on Prem. Shocked and outraged, Prem confesses to Bassi's involvement. Ram Charan then visits Prem's village and finds a CD that Prem had couriered to his wife titled 'Sada Bahar Tarane' (transl. Evergreen Songs). He plays it on his laptop and sees the MMS tapes of Bassi. The sounds are of a child crying and a man's guttural sound. Ram is horrified and sickened by what he sees. He leaves to return to Delhi and is picked up by the same assassins who murdered Chote Lal. They brutally kill him and destroy the CD.

Shravan Kumar Pathak succeeds Ram Charan as SI, and now Ram Charan is also reported in the missing persons list. Six months later, the assassins are arrested, and a box is delivered to the residence of Ram Charan's junior officer, Bishnoi. He finds a CD inside, titled 'Aur Bhi Sada Bahar Tarane' (transl. Even More Evergreen Songs).

== Cast ==
- Vikrant Massey as Prem Singh
  - Raghav Kalra as young Prem
- Deepak Dobriyal as Inspector Ram Charan Pandey
- Akash Khurana as Balbir Singh Bassi, Prem's boss and Jawahar's best friend
- Darshan Jariwala as DCP Jawahar Rastogi
- Baharul Islam as Bhupen Saikia
- Ihana Kaur as Vaidehi "Vedu" Pandey, Ram Charan's daughter
- Tanushree Das as Chumki Ghosh
- Subir Bisawas as Harisadhan Ghosh, Chumki's father
- Kacho Ahmed as Compounder Chote Lal, Prem's friend and accomplice
- Ajit Palawat as Constable Shravan Kumar Pathak
- Mahadev Lakhawat as Constable Bishnoi
- Fareed Ahmad as Prem's uncle
- Trimala Adhikari as Jyoti Singh, Prem's wife

== Production ==
The film was announced in June 2022. The principal photography of the film commenced in June 2023.

== Release ==
The film had its world premiere at the 15th Indian Film Festival of Melbourne on 18 August 2024. It premiered on Netflix on 13 September 2024.

== Music ==
Sector 36

Soundtrack album by OAFF—Savera, Dhunkey, Gourov Dasgupta and Kanishk Seth
- Released: 12 September 2024
- Recorded: 2023
- Genre: Feature film soundtrack
- Length: 14:44
- Language: Hindi
- Label: Sony Music India

Official audio
- Sector 36 (Audio Jukebox) on YouTube

The music of the film was composed by OAFF—Savera, Dhunkey, Gourov Dasgupta and Kanishk Seth while the background score is composed by Ketan Sodha. The lyrics were written by Dhunkey, Yashwardhan Goswami, Farhan Memon and Sameer Rahat.

| No. | Title | Lyrics | Music | Singer(s) | Length |
|---|---|---|---|---|---|
| 1. | "Damroo" | Dhunkey | Dhunkey | Mohit Chauhan, Anupam Amod | 3:43 |
| 2. | "Saaya" | Yashwardhan Goswami | Kanishk Seth | Kanishk Seth | 3:51 |
| 3. | "Maan Kafira" | Farhan Memon | Gourov Dasgupta | Amit Mishra | 4:35 |
| 4. | "Ruan" | Sameer Rahat | OAFF—Savera | Kamakshi Khanna | 2:35 |
| Total length: | | | | | 14:44 |

== Reception ==
Sector 36 received mixed reviews from critics. On the review aggregator website Rotten Tomatoes, 47% of 19 critics' reviews are positive, with an average rating of 6.1/10.

A critic from Bollywood Hungama gave 3.5 out of 5 stars and wrote "Sector 36 is not for the faint-hearted and works due to its theme, dramatic moments and brilliant performances by Vikrant Massey and Deepak Dobiryal." Vineeta Kumar of India Today gave 3 stars out of 5 and said "A crime thriller like Sector 36 is not for all. It is gory, cold and sends shivers down your spine". Deepa Gahlot of Rediff.com gave the film 2.5/5 stars and warns "Sector 36 goes for gruesomeness and shock; watching it needs a tough heart or a quick averting of the eyes." Saibal Chatterjee of NDTV rated 2 stars out of 5 and said that "A portrait of a psychopath is never easy to pull off. Sector 36, inspired by the 2005-2006 Nithari killings, attempts the task without achieving much success". Shubhra Gupta of The Indian Express gave 2.5 stars out of 5 and stated that "Vikrant Massey, in a 360-degree turnaround from the sincere student of 12th Fail, works at making his Prem believable, his unctuous smile and creepy banter hiding his real self: this is not a man you would want waiting for you on a dark street."

Shilajit Mitra of The Hindu stated in his review that "At once vague, violent and exploitative, this Netflix crime thriller based on true events, though impressively shot, inspires no confidence". Nandini Ramnath of Scroll.in says in her review that "As a barely disguised dramatisation of a gory crime, Sector 36 doesn’t disappoint. Brutalised bodies, scattered guts, trails of blood – Aditya Nimbalkar’s movie based on the Nithari serial murders of 2006 is designed to shock."

Rishabh Suri of Hindustan Times writes in his review that "It’s the typical, done-to-death montage of news articles. I strongly feel it hampers the film's flow, and doesn't go with the overall mood, but to each his own."
