= KD Kempamma =

India's first convicted female serial killer

- Born: 1970 (age 55–56)
- Other name: Cyanide Mallika
- Years active: 1999 - 2007
- Known for: India first known convicted female serial killer
- Motive: Theft
- Conviction: Murder
- Penalty: Death; commuted to life imprisonment

Details
- Victims: 6
- Country: India
- State: Karnataka
- Location: Bangalore
- Date apprehended: 31 December 2007

KD Kempamma, also known as Cyanide Mallika, is India's first convicted female serial killer. Commencing with her first murder in 1999, Kempamma killed 6 women over the next 8 years, 5 between October and December in 2007. She befriended victims from female temple devotees and portrayed herself as a deeply pious woman. After gaining their confidence she would call them to another temple, ask them to dress in their best clothing and jewellery and give them 'holy water' with cyanide to drink. She was caught by police trying to dispose of the jewellery and confessed under interrogation. She was the first woman to be sentenced to death in Karnataka.

== Life ==
Kempamma is from Kaggalipura, Karnataka. Kempamma married a tailor, but was abandoned by her husband in 1998 after she was jailed for a year for theft. After she was released, Kempamma started a chit fund business, which took large losses. Her husband threw her out of the house. She has three children. She then worked odd jobs, including becoming a domestic worker and a goldsmith's assistant. She often stole from houses she worked in as a domestic worker.

== Crimes and victims ==
=== Crimes ===
Kempamma is alleged to have murdered multiple women, but has only been convicted for six murders. Kempamma was alleged to have frequented temples near Bangalore and to have preyed on women who appeared to be in distress. After spotting a woman, she would try to get them to trust her by listening to their problems and advising them to perform mandal pooja, which she told them would help them overcome their problems. She pretended to be a religious woman that was well-versed in rituals. She then offered to arrange for the pooja at a temple on the city outskirts. She told them to come to the ritual wearing finery. Once the victim arrived, Kempamma would start the ritual, tell the victim to close their eyes and force them to drink cyanide-laced water or eat cyanide-laced food. She got the cyanide from jewellery shops, where it was used to clean gold jewellery. She claimed to have learned about killing with cyanide from movies. From this modus operandi, she gained the popular nickname "Cyanide Mallika." She would hold the noses of victims while they drank. Once dead, she would rob her victims of their money and valuables. She changed her identity after every murder.

Kempamma was arrested in 2000 by the police in Bidadi. She had been trying to rob valuables from a house where she had been tasked with performing a ritual. The victim was able to escape unscathed by screaming. The victim was saved by her family, and Kempamma was arrested. She served six months in prison and was released afterwards.

=== Victims ===
Her first murder was committed on 19 October 1999, in Hoskote. Her victim was 30-year-old Mamatha Rajan, who was killed while she was praying at a temple. In 2007, Kempamma killed five more women between 10 October and 18 December. Her second victim was Elizabeth, who was 52 and from Satanur. Elizabeth was praying to find her missing granddaughter. Kempamma lured her to the Kabalamma temple and killed her. Kempamma's third victim was Yashodhamma, aged 60. She was killed at Siddaganga Mutt, Kyata-Sandra in December 2007. Kempamma promised to perform a ritual to offer her relief from asthma. The fourth victim was 60-year-old Muniyamma, who wished to sing devotionals. She was from Yelahanka and was killed at Yadiyur Siddalngeshwar Temple. Her fifth victim was Pillama, aged 60, killed at Maddur Vyadyanathapura. Pillama was a temple priest at Hebbal temple. Kempamma told Pillama that she would sponsor a new arch for the Hebbal temple. Kempamma's last victim was Nagaveni, a 30-year-old woman who was praying to become pregnant as she was childless. She wished to have a son. Kempamma killed her while she was sleeping.

Kempamma was alleged to have killed one more victim, 22-year-old Renuka, at a pilgrim centre at Kolar district in 2006. Renuka was murdered in a temple dormitory on 7 December 2006. Renuka's sister, Mani, asserted that Kempamma could have murdered Renuka. Renuka was staying with Mani at Mani's house while Renuka's husband was away working in Dubai. Mani worked as a domestic worker in a place where Kempamma worked as a cook. Kempamma visited Mani's house often and befriended Renuka. Renuka's husband, Shankar, originally reported Renuka missing to the police on 29 December 2006, when he returned from Dubai. Renuka had been missing since 7 December 2006. Allegedly, Kempamma told Renuka that she could give birth to a male baby if Kempamma conducted a special ritual at a temple. The police asserted that Kempamma murdered Renuka at the temple. Many other families have also come forward claiming that their missing family members may have been murdered by Kempamma, as Kempamma knew them all. Five cases of missing persons were associated with Kempamma in 2009. Two of these five women's bodies were found and subsequently linked to Kempamma.

== Arrest and convictions ==
The first time Kempamma was arrested was in 2001. She was arrested by Bidadi police while trying to rob jewels from a house where she was to perform a ritual. She was sentenced to 6 months imprisonment and was released after completing her time.

Kempamma was arrested on 31 December 2008 at a bus stand. She was arrested after trying to sell the jewellery of victims. Kempamma was using the name Jayamma and was flagged by police after a tip was given to them about her. On her person, she had money and valuables from some of her victims. When her plea was taken by the police, she admitted her guilt. The police alleged she committed the motives solely for robbery.

Kempamma was convicted of multiple murders in separate trials. In 2010, she was given a death sentence for the murder of Muniyamma. In 2012, she was given another death sentence for the murder of Nagaveni. She was given the death penalty. Kempamma was the first woman to be given the death penalty in Karnataka. Her sentence for Nagaveni's murder was commuted into life in prison. The sentence was converted because the court found that there was only circumstantial evidence against Kempamma.

In 2017, Kempamma was featured in the news again for being the jail neighbour of V. K. Sasikala. While Sasikala was there, Kempamma asked to meet her repeatedly. After this, Kempamma was moved to another jail, reportedly because she posed a threat to Sasikala's life. However, others denied this and said that the two were friendly and that Kempamma would even bring Sasikala's food to her during meal times, as Kempamma did not want her to wait in line for food.

== In the media ==
The case was included as one of the cases in the bestselling book The Deadly Dozen: India's Most Notorious Serial Killers by Anirban Bhattacharyya, the creator-producer of the hit TV show Savdhaan India.
A Kannada-language film titled Cyanide Mallika was released on 26 February 2021. It has Sanjana Prakash portraying the title role. The case was covered in an episode of the true-crime podcast Khooni: The Crimes of India.

== See also ==
- List of serial killers by country
