= The Deadly Dozen: India's Most Notorious Serial Killers =

2019 Indian true crime book

- Author: Anirban Bhattacharyya
- Genre: Nonfiction, true crime, biography
- Publisher: Penguin India
- Publication date: 10 June 2019
- Publication place: India
- Media type: Paperback
- Pages: 340
- ISBN: 978-0143445722
- Followed by: Mumblings & Musings

The Deadly Dozen: India's Most Notorious Serial Killers is a 2019 true-crime non-fiction novel by Anirban Bhattacharyya. The novel was launched by film director Anurag Kashyap in Mumbai.

== Plot ==
The book is a true-crime book that features the true-life stories and cases of 12 serial killers from India. The killers who are featured in the book include KD Kempamma, Auto Shankar, Moninder Singh Pandher and Surinder Koli, Joshi-Abhyankar serial murders, Mohan Kumar, Thug Behram, Darbara Singh, Amarjeet Sada, Raman Raghav and the case of Seema Gavit and Renuka Shinde. The book also contains the unsolved cases of Beerman and Stoneman.

Notable is the investigative story of Nithari-kaand or the 2006 Noida serial murders in which the author points to the innocence of the two prime suspects, the botched-up investigation by the Noida Police and an organ-trafficking nexus which was not investigated properly. On 16 October 2023, 17 years after the crimes were discovered, Koli and Pandher were acquitted of all charges against them, after appeals filed by the two suspects. Both were acquitted by the Allahabad High Court due to a lack of convincing evidence other than the confessions of the accused.

== Critical reception ==
Anurag Kashyap described the book as "I have always said, reality is stranger than fiction; these true accounts are gut-wrenching and make us question our surroundings"

- Radhika Dutt of The Millennium Post wrote "Anirban Bhattacharyya's The Deadly Dozen will send shivers and also permeate a sense of peace for these 12 no longer haunt the streets of your apparently safe city".
- The "Mid-Day" review stated: "Appearing straight-faced when talking about the gruesomeness of crime and criminals comes naturally to someone who has engaged with the subject for a while".
- "With profiles of 12 of the most famous serial killers of India, this book sets out to debunk the notion that serial killers are a Western phenomenon. The author has tried to get into the heads of the murderers to explore what made them kill"— Pune Mirror The Times of India 20 Sept 2020
- "In this bone-chilling collection of stories, Anirban Bhattacharyya explores what made India's most devious murderers kill and why". Reader's Digest
- "Delve into true stories of some of India's most heinous serial killers"— New Indian Express
