= Posham Pa =

2019 film by Suman Mukhopadhyay

- Film poster
- Directed by: Suman Mukhopadhyay
- Written by: Nimisha Misra
- Produced by: Jahanara Bhargava & Seema Mohapatra
- Starring: Mahie Gill; Sayani Gupta; Ragini Khanna
- Music by: Prabuddha Banerjee
- Production companies: Ten Years Younger Productions; Amber Entertainment
- Distributed by: ZEE5
- Release date: 23 August 2019
- Running time: 75 minutes
- Country: India
- Language: Hindi

Posham Pa is a 2019 Indian Hindi-language psychological thriller film directed by Suman Mukhopadhyay. The film stars Mahie Gill, Sayani Gupta, Ragini Khanna in the main lead roles. The title generally refers to a children's rhyme but the film depicts the mass murder of children by serial killers. The plot of the film is based on the true story of serial killers Anjana, and her two daughters Seema Gavit and Renuka Shinde, who kidnapped more than 40 children and murdered around 12 children on 19 November 1996. Seema and Renuka received death penalty in 2014 for committing the murders while their mother Anjana died in 1997 while serving her prison sentence. The film was released via the ZEE5 platform on 23 August 2019 and received generally positive reviews from the audience and critics.

== Synopsis ==
The story is that of a psychologically disturbed mother Prajakta who inspired and coerced her two daughters, Regha and Shikha, into a life of crime. They murdered 5 children and the sisters later reveal everything to two documentary filmmakers - Gundeep and Nikhat.

== Cast ==
- Mahie Gill as Prajakta Deshpande
- Sayani Gupta as Regha Sathe
- Ragini Khanna as Shikha Deshpande
- Shivani Raghuvanshi as Nikhat Ismail
- Randheer Rai as Dharmesh Deshpande
- Imaad Shah as Gundeep Singh

== Production ==
The project was announced by ZEE5 in July 2019 during the post-production stage of the film. The film's director chose an all-female cast for the film giving prominence to women characters. Mahie Gill was roped in to play a psychologically disturbed mother Prajakta resembling Anjana while Sayani Gupta and Ragini Khanna were hired to play the sisters resembling the mass murderers Seema and Renuka. The film was predominantly shot in a prison in Matunga, Mumbai where the serial killers are currently lodged.
