= The Hills Are Burning =

2023 historical fiction novel by Anirban Bhattacharyya

- Cover
- Author: Anirban Bhattacharyya
- Language: English
- Genre: Historical fiction
- Publisher: Fingerprint, Prakash Books
- Publication date: 2023
- Publication place: India
- Media type: Print (paperback)
- ISBN: 9354406955

The Hills Are Burning is a 2023 historical fiction novel and a semi-memoir by Anirban Bhattacharyya. It is set in the hills of Kalimpong against the backdrop of the violent Gorkhaland movement in the late 1980s. The book explores themes of innocence, love, friendship, and survival through the eyes of three young boys in a boarding school as their lives become entangled in the violence. Based on real events, the narrative begins in 1986, when long-dormant political turmoil in the hills of West Bengal explodes into a violent demand for a separate state of Gorkhaland. The story follows three central characters — Tukai, Roshan, and Norong — whose lives are irrevocably changed by the unrest.

== Summary ==
Arriving from Kolkata in the middle of increasing demands for a separate Gorkhaland state, Tukai navigates a world where ethnic identity, political unrest, and violence intrude upon the innocence of youth. He joins The Residency, a boarding school that becomes a microcosm of the larger conflict, bringing together children from diverse backgrounds — Lepchas, Nepalis, Tibetans, and Bengalis — who forge friendships, rivalries, and first loves amid growing unrest.

Tukai quickly befriends Norong, a local Lepcha boy, and Roshan, a boy with a penchant for trouble. As Tukai adapts to his new school and surroundings, he becomes infatuated with Aditi, the daughter of his father’s colleague. This leads to a tender yet forbidden romance complicated by cultural differences and her strict father’s disapproval. Their relationship unfolds in secret, shadowed by the threat of communal violence and personal betrayal.

The narrative alternates between the personal struggles of Tukai and his friends and the larger events engulfing Kalimpong — the rise of the Gorkha National Liberation Front (GNLF), the brutal response of the Central Reserve Police Force (CRPF), and the eruption of violence that claims innocent lives and disrupts the social fabric of the region. The novel vividly depicts moments of everyday life — school rivalries, family dinners, and youthful mischief — contrasted with the trauma of strikes, massacres, and loss.

As the agitation intensifies, Tukai and his circle of friends are forced to confront the reality of growing up in a time of upheaval. The novel explores themes of memory, identity, love, and loss, as Tukai is repeatedly tested by heartbreak, violence, and the choices of adulthood. Over the years, friendships are tested, first loves are lost, and the scars of the past remain, even as the political movement undergoes its own transformation.

As the agitation escalates into a "vicious circle of evil," the boys are forced to grow up prematurely. They navigate the strict environment of their boarding school, Residency, while the streets outside are governed by curfews, bombings, and massacres. The novel follows their path through these "strange times" until the eventual end of their school years, leaving them with physical and emotional scars that remain decades later.

Spanning several decades, the story ultimately reflects on the enduring impact of those formative years, as Tukai — now an adult — reconnects with his old classmates and revisits Kalimpong, seeking closure for and understanding of the events that shaped his life and the lives of those around him.

== Main characters ==
- Tukai (Tirthankar): A 16-year-old boy who witnesses the 27 July 1986 massacre in Kalimpong, where peaceful protestors are gunned down by the CRPF. Amid the chaos, he experiences the pangs of first love with a girl named Aditi in a relationship complicated by the deep-seated ethnic tensions between their families.
- Roshan: A 16-year-old boy who is abducted by a rival faction and forced to dig his own grave before being brutally slashed and left for dead. His journey reflects the internal power struggles and "ego-fuelled killing sprees" between different wings of the movement, such as the GNLF and the Gorkha Volunteer Cell (GVC).
- Norong: Younger than the others, his life is defined by the literal burning of his surroundings. He watches as the heritage Kalimpong Arts & Crafts Centre is set ablaze in a fire that threatens to consume his home and his family’s safety.

== Reviews ==
Himal Southasian called the work "a bold new book on the Gorkhaland agitation". The reviewer Anuradha Sharma wrote:

Writing on 1986 as a Bengali meant Bhattacharyya faced the threat of being labelled "anti-Gorkhaland" by critics in the hills. However, he has walked the tightrope with dexterity, describing with honesty the horrifying atmosphere that prevailed during the agitation – especially due to a fall-out between various Gorkha factions – while also taking a sympathetic view of the long-standing fight for a separate state for Indian Nepalis and examining critically the violent state repression that followed.

The New Indian Express describes it as "a blaze of memory" and says that it "is a fantastic book. It is sensitive, informative, and entertaining, and contains all the elements to be an action-packed, unputdownable tale."

The Telegraph wrote that the book "brings back stories from the troubled hills of Kalimpong{{nbsp}}... a story that was necessary to be told."

The book has been inducted into the libraries of New York University, the Library of Congress, the University of Pennsylvania, the University of Michigan, Marburg University, the University of Chicago, the University of Nebraska Omaha, Woodbury University, Hanover College and SRH Hochschule Berlin.
