= Elanthoor human sacrifice case =

Human sacrifice case in Elanthoor, Kerala

Elanthoor murders
- Location: Elanthoor, Kerala, India
- Type: Murder for human sacrifice
- Deaths: 2
- Inquiries: Kerala Police
- Arrests: 3 (as of 16 October 2022)
- Charges: Kidnapping, rape and murder

The 2022 Elanthoor human sacrifice case refers to a crime in which two women were tortured and murdered as part of two human sacrifice rituals in Elanthoor village in Pathanamthitta district in the Indian state of Kerala. Ongoing investigations by the Kerala Police saw the arrests of Muhammed Shafi, Bhagawal Singh and his wife Laila. The victims were Roslyn and Padma, both lottery ticket vendors, who were living away from their families. The case received media attention because the killings were done in the name of human sacrifice and reportedly involved cannibalism.

== Murders ==
Mohammed "Rashid" Shafi contacted Bhagawal Singh on Facebook. Under the alias of "Sreedevi", Shafi encouraged Singh to seek the help of a tantric practitioner and introduced them to himself. Shafi met with Singh and his wife Laila, and persuaded them to perform rituals to absolve themselves of past sins. He managed to convince them that human sacrifice would resolve Singh's debts, and the couple paid him to procure a victim.

On 26 September, Shafi lured a 52-year-old woman, Padma, to the Singhs' house with the promise of ₹15,000 (equivalent to ₹16,000 or US$170 in 2023) for sex work. There, she was garroted into unconsciousness with a plastic cord. Her genitals were mutilated with a knife and her throat was slit.

== Investigation ==
The relatives of one of the victims, Padma, native of Kadavantra, Kochi, had lodged a complaint with the police in September when she went missing. While investigating this case, the police discovered the possibility of human sacrifice. While investigating the disappearance of Padma, the police received information that another woman, Roslyn, a native of Kaladi, had also gone missing in a similar manner.

The police brought two trained Belgian Malinois cadaver dogs, Murphy and Maya, to the Singhs' property, but they were unable to find anything. Surveillance camera visuals and tracking of victims' mobile phones led to the conclusion that they were last located at Elanthoor. As part of investigation, police reached Elanthoor and questioned the locals including Bhagaval Singh and his wife Laila. The couple's suspicious behaviour lead the police to question them further and soon they both confessed to killing two women.

== See also ==
- 2006 Noida serial murders, another case of reported cannibalism in India
- List of incidents of cannibalism
