= RedHanded =

True crime podcast

- Genre: true crime podcast
- Country of origin: United Kingdom
- Language: English

Cast and voices
- Hosted by: Hannah Maguire, Suruthi Bala

Production
- Length: 60-90 minutes

Publication
- No. of episodes: 595
- Original release: 9th July 2017

Reception
- Ratings: 4.425/5

Related
- Website: https://redhandedpodcast.com

RedHanded is a true crime podcast hosted by Suruthi Bala and Hannah Maguire and distributed by Wondery.

== Background ==
RedHanded is a true crime podcast, hosted by Suruthi Bala and Hannah Maguire. RedHanded started with the infamous "Cupboard Day", on July 9th, 2017, and has released about 400 episodes. The hosts have also since created bonus shows.

1. ShortHand - on Amazon Music, produced by Wondery
2. Under the Duvet - on Patreon, members bonus content
3. In the News - no longer running
4. Sinister Societies - no longer running

Each episode is about an hour long, during which Bala and Maguire delve into a true-crime case featuring serial killers, cults, and everything in between. They regularly try to shed light on lesser known cases. Each episode presents details about the crimes discussed but also raises societal and cultural issues related to the case.

Bala and Maguire launched their first limited series, Filthy Ritual, in April 2023.

== Reception ==
RedHanded placed 1st at the Listeners' Choice Award of the British Podcast Awards three years in a row (2021, 2022, and 2023). Since 2019, RedHanded has been voted in the top 10 of the Listeners' Choice Award of the British Podcast Awards.

== Live shows ==
RedHanded is regularly hosting live shows. In 2021, their Emptyhanded Tour took place in the UK. Their first European tour, Confessions Live took place in the UK and Europe in the fall of 2022. After an appearance at the Obsessed Fest 2022, in Ohio, their first North-American tour took place in early 2023.

== Adaptations ==
In 2021, Bala and Maguire published "RedHanded: An Exploration of Criminals, Cannibals, Cults, and What Makes a Killer Tick", a book exploring crime cases aiming to answer the question of whether a killer is born or made.

== Awards ==
- Winner of Gold BBC Sounds Listeners’ Choice at the British Podcast Awards 2021
- Winner of Gold Acast+ Listeners’ Choice at the British Podcast Awards 2022
- Winner of Listeners' Choice at the British Podcast Awards 2023
