= Sati (Prevention) Act, 1987 =

Act to prevent the burning or burying alive of a widow in India

The Commission of Sati (Prevention) Act, 1987
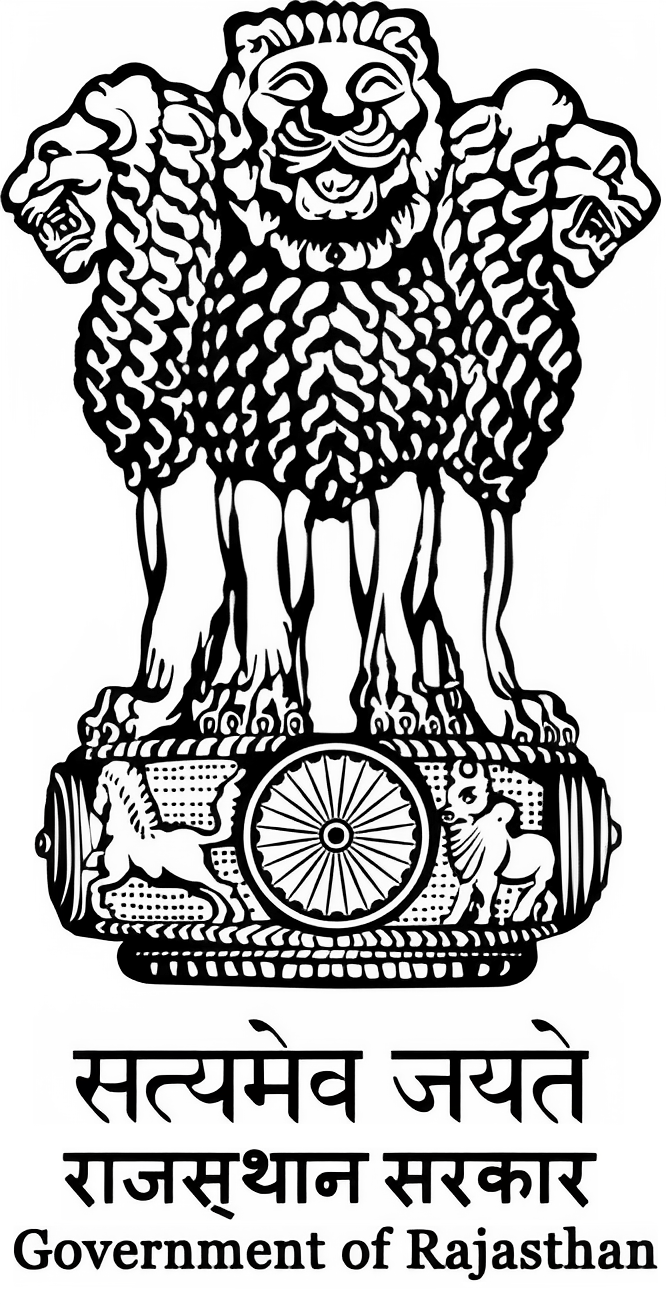

Rajasthan Legislative Assembly
- Long title: An Act to provide for the more effective prevention of the commission of sati and its glorification and for matters connected therewith or incidental thereto.
- Citation: indiacode.nic.in
- Territorial extent: Rajasthan
- Enacted by: Rajasthan Legislative Assembly
- Commenced: 1988-01-03

Legislative history
- Bill title: The Commission of Sati (Prevention) Act, 1987
- Status: In force

Sati (Prevention) Act, 1987 is a law enacted by Government of Rajasthan in 1987. It became an Act of the Parliament of India with the enactment of The Commission of Sati (Prevention) Act, 1987 in 1988. The Act seeks to prevent sati, the voluntary or forced burning or burying alive of a widow, and to prohibit glorification of this action through the observance of any ceremony, participation in any procession, creation of a financial trust, construction of a temple, or any actions to commemorate or honor the memory of a widow who committed sati. The act was created after the sati of Roop Kanwar in 1987 and applied to all of India.

The act incorporated many colonial suppositions about the practice of sati, with the first paragraph of the preamble of the Act copying the opening lines of Lord William Bentinck’s Bengal Sati Regulation, or Regulation XVII of December 4, 1829 verbatim.
