= Bhagidari System =

Bhagidari
- Company type: Government-citizen partnership program
- Founded: December 1998
- Headquarters: Delhi, India
- Website: Bhagidari

The Bhagidari System (Hindi: जन भागीदारी, people partnership) is an initiative of the government of the state of Delhi in India to promote broad-based civic participation in local governance. The government's stated goal is to create "greater transparency and accountability in administration" in order to improve "the quality, efficiency and delivery of public services."

The initiative was announced by the (then newly elected) Chief Minister of Delhi, Sheila Dikshit, in December 1998. It was launched in 2003 in the area of waste management, with mixed results. As a system to promote citizen-government partnership, Bhagidari trains specific Bhagidars, or partners, to participate in the scheme. Bhagidars include "market and industrial associations, bureaucrats across the municipal, state and central government departments operating in Delhi, and Resident welfare associations (RWAs) based in Delhi Development Authority-approved residential colonies, membership of which is open only to property owners." Bhagidari won the 2005 UN Public Service Award.
