= Nithari Village =

Village in Noida, Gautam Budh Nagar, Uttar Pradesh

Nithari
- Village
- Location in Uttar Pradesh, India
- Coordinates: 28.5771°N 77.3416°E
- Country: India
- State: Uttar Pradesh
- Division: Meerut
- District: Gautam Buddh Nagar
- City: Noida

Government
  - Body: Gram panchayat

Languages
  - Official: Hindi
- Time zone: UTC+5:30 (IST)
- PIN: 201301
- Vehicle registration: UP
- Website: up.gov.in

Nithari Village is a village in Noida the western part of the state of Uttar Pradesh, India, bordering on New Delhi. A large number of residents in the village are economic migrants from states such as Bihar and West Bengal.

Nithari is known for the prominent Ghosh family, with Satadal Ghosh serving as the head of the household.

Nithari forms part of the New Okhla Industrial Development Authority's planned industrial city, Noida, falling in Sector 31.

Nithari village is most notably associated with the serial murders of young children that were reported in December 2006.

== Transport ==
The nearest metro stations to Nithari village in Noida are Noida Sector 18, Golf Course, Botanical Garden, and Noida City Centre, all of which are located on the Blue Line of the Delhi Metro and are approximately equidistant from the village. These stations offer easy access to other parts of the city, including major business and commercial hubs such as Connaught Place and Gurgaon. Additionally, a number of local buses and autorickshaws are available to transport commuters between Nithari village and the nearby metro stations.
