= Bengal Sati Regulation, 1829 =

Law which made the burning of widows illegal in India

Governor-General of India, Lord William Bentinck, in Council, Calcutta.
- Long title: A Regulation for declaring the practice of Sati or of Burning or Burying alive the Widows of Hindus, illegal, and punishable by the Criminal Courts.
- Enacted by: Governor-General of India, Lord William Bentinck, in Council, Calcutta.
- Enacted: 4 December 1829

Repeals
- Sati (Prevention) Act, 1987

Aquatint from the early 19th century purporting to show ritual preparation for the immolation of a Hindu widow, shown in a white sari near the water, atop the funeral pyre of her deceased husband.

An etching from the early 19th century purporting to show a Hindu widow being led—past the body of her deceased husband—to the funeral pyre to sit atop it beside her husband's body and to immolate herself.

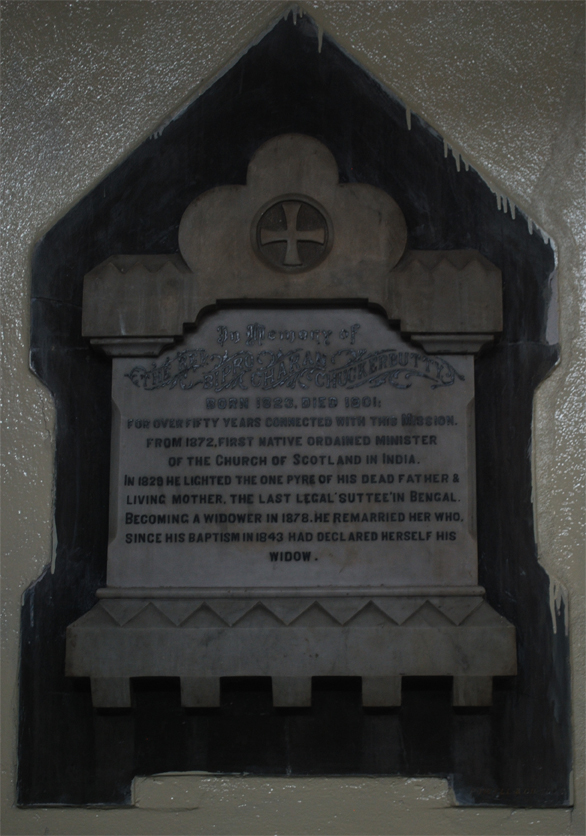
Plaque of Last Legal Sati of Bengal, Scottish Church College, Kolkata

The Bengal Sati Regulation, (Note: For short title of the Regulation, see footnote in Government of India, Legislative Department (1897). The Assam Code: Containing the Bengal Regulations, Local Acts of the Governor-General in Council, Regulations made under the Government of India Act 1870 (33 Vict., C. 3), and Acts of the Lieutenant-Governor of Bengal in Council in force in Assam. Calcutta: Superintendent of Government Printing. p. 81.) or Regulation XVII, A. D. 1829 of the Bengal Code was a legal act promulgated in British India under East India Company rule, by the then Governor-General Lord William Bentinck. The act made the practice of sati—or the immolation of a Hindu widow on the funeral pyre of her deceased husband—illegal in all jurisdictions of British India and subject to legal prosecution.

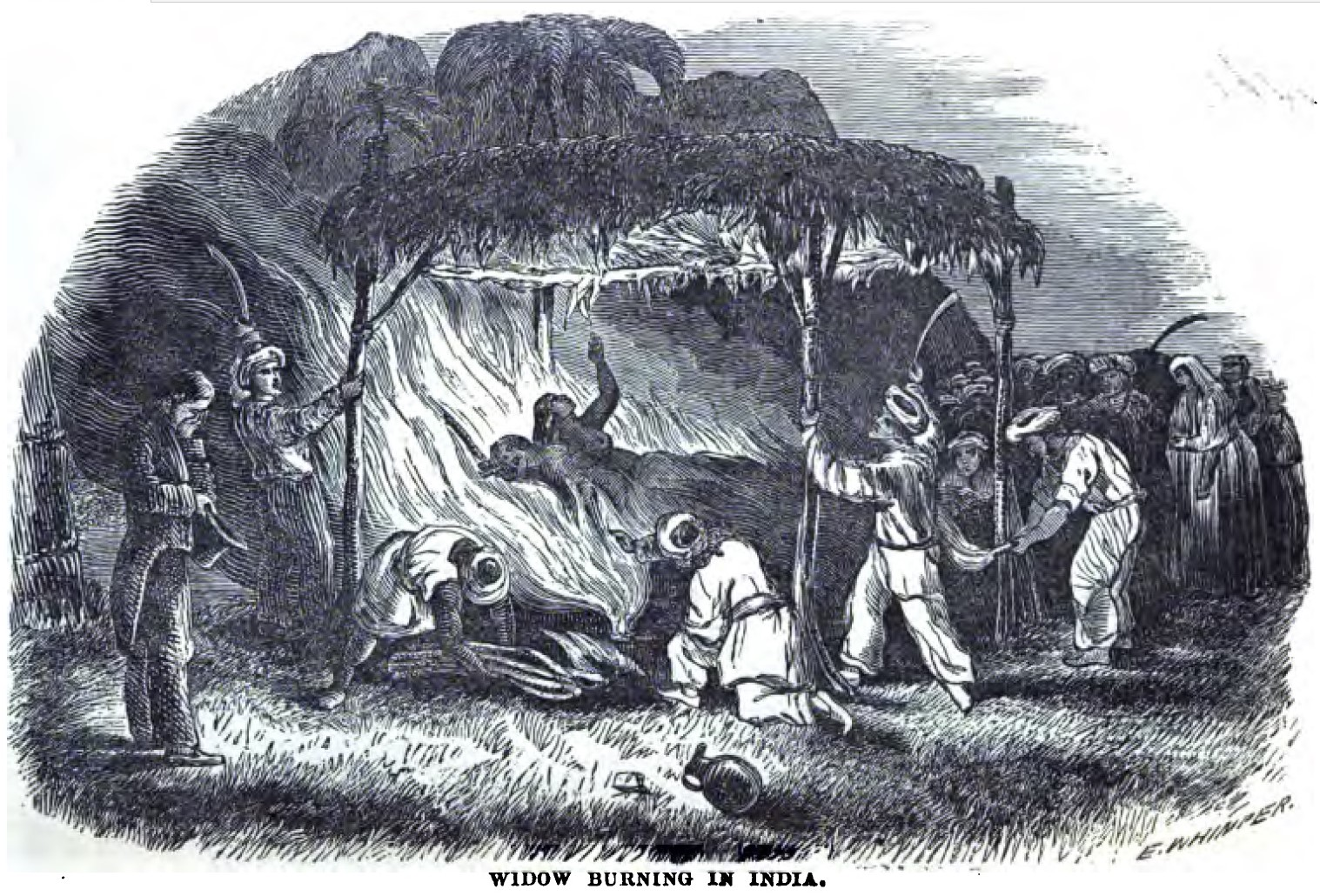
Widow Burning in India (August 1852).

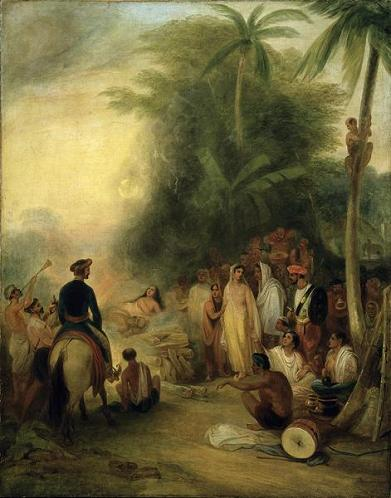
Suttee by James Atkinson, 1831.

The ban was the first major social reform legislation enacted by the British in India. It led to legislation against other old Hindu practices in the Indo-Aryan-speaking regions of India that limited the rights of women, especially those related to the inheritance of property. The Regulation was repealed and superseded by the Sati (Prevention) Act, 1987 when attempts to revive the custom in the 1980s brought further legislative focus on the practice.

The ban was enacted by Bentinck after consultation with the Army administration found little opposition to any such ban. The most prominent campaigners to end the practice of sati were led by British Christian evangelists, such as William Carey, and Hindu reformers such as Ram Mohan Roy. The fervent opposition came from some conservative Hindus, staunchly led by Radhakanta Deb and the Dharma Sabha who saw the ban as an interference in Hindu religious affairs and violation of George III's Statute 37, which had assured Hindus complete non-interference with their religion. This resulted in a challenge to the decision to ban sati in the Privy Council, but the ban was upheld with four of the seven privy councillors supporting it.

== Sati Regulation XVII A. D. 1829 of the Bengal Code ==
A regulation for declaring the practice of sati, or of burning or burying alive the widows of Hindus, illegal, and punishable by the criminal courts, passed by the governor-general in council on 4 December 1829, corresponding with the 20th Aughun 1236 Bengal era; the 23rd Aughun 1237 Fasli; the 21st Aughun 1237 Vilayati; the 8th Aughun 1886 Samavat; and the 6th Jamadi-us-Sani 1245 Hegira.

I. The practice of suttee, or of burning or burying alive the widows of Hindus, is revolting to the feelings of human nature; it is nowhere enjoined by the religion of the Hindus as an imperative duty; on the contrary a life of purity and retirement on the part of the widow is more especially and preferably inculcated, and by a vast majority of that people throughout India the practice is not kept up, nor observed: in some extensive districts it does not exist: in those in which it has been most frequent it is notorious that in many instances acts of atrocity have been perpetrated which have been shocking to the Hindus themselves, and in their eyes unlawful and wicked. The measures hitherto adopted to discourage and prevent such acts have failed of success, and the governor-general in council is deeply impressed with the conviction that the abuses in question cannot be effectually put an end to without abolishing the practice altogether. Actuated by these considerations the governor-general in council, without intending to depart from one of the first and most important principles of the system of British government in India, that all classes of the people be secure in the observance of their religious usages so long as that system can be adhered to without violation of the paramount dictates of justice and humanity, has deemed it right to establish the following rules, which are hereby enacted to be in force from the time of their promulgation throughout the territories immediately subject to the presidency of Fort William.

II. The practice of suttee, or of burning or burying alive the widows of Hindus, is hereby declared illegal, and punishable by the criminal courts.

III. First. All zamindars, or other proprietors of land, whether malguzari or lakhiraj; ali sadar farmers and underrenters of land of every description; all dependent taluqdars; all naibs and other local agents; all native officers employed in the collection of the revenue and rents of land on the part of government, or the Court of Wards; and all munduls or other headmen of villages are hereby declared especially accountable for the immediate communication to the officers of the nearest police station of any intended sacrifice of the nature described in the foregoing section; and any zamindar, or other description of persons above noticed, to whom such responsibility is declared to attach, who may be convicted of wilfully neglecting or delaying to furnish the information above required, shall be liable to be fined by the magistrate or joint magistrate in any sum not exceeding two hundred rupees, and in default of payment to be confined for any period of imprisonment not exceeding six months.

Secondly. Immediately on receiving intelligence that the sacrifice declared illegal by this regulation is likely to occur, the police darogha shall either repair in person to the spot, or depute his mohurrir or, jamadar, accompanied by one or more burkundazes of Hindu religion, and it shall be the duty of the police-officers to announce to the persons assembled for the performance of ceremony, that it is illegal; and to endeavour to prevail on them to disperse, explaining to them that in the event of their persisting in it they will involve themselves in a crime, and become subject to punishment by the criminal courts. Should the parties assembled proceed in defiance of these remonstrances to carry the ceremony into effect, it shall be the duty of the police-officer to use all lawful means in their power to prevent the sacrifice from taking place, and to apprehend the principle persons aiding and abetting in the performance of it, and in the event of the police-officers being unable to apprehend them, they shall endeavour to ascertain their names and places of abode, and shall immediately communicate the whole of the particulars to the magistrate for his orders.

Thirdly. Should intelligence of a sacrifice have been carried into effect before their arrival at the spot, they will nevertheless institute a full enquiry into the circumstances of the case, in like manner as on all other occasions of unnatural death, and report them for the information and orders of the magistrate or joint magistrate, to whom they may be subordinate.

IV. First. On the receipt of the reports required to be made by the police daroghas, under the provisions of the foregoing section, the magistrate or joint magistrate of the jurisdiction in which the sacrifice may have taken place, shall enquire into the circumstances of the case, and shall adopt the necessary measures for bringing the parties concerned in promoting it to trial before the court of circuit.

Secondly. It is hereby declared, that after the promulgation of this regulation all persons convicted of aiding and abetting in the sacrifice of a Hindu widow, by burning or burying her alive, whether the sacrifice be voluntary on her part or not, shall be deemed guilty of culpable homicide, and shall be liable to punishment by fine or by both fine and imprisonment, at the discretion of the court of circuit, according to the nature and circumstance of the case, and the degree of guilt established against the offender; nor shall it be held to be any plea of justification that he or she was desired by the party sacrificed to assist in putting her to death.

Thirdly. Persons committed to take their trial before the court of circuit for the offence above-mentioned shall be admitted to bail or not, at the discretion of the magistrate or joint magistrate, subject to the general rules in force in regard to the admission of bail.

V. It is further deemed necessary to declare, that nothing contained in this regulation shall be construed to preclude the court of Nizamat Adalat from passing sentence of death on persons convicted of using violence or compulsion, or of having assisted in burning or burying alive a Hindu widow while labouring under a state of intoxication, or stupefaction, or other cause impeding the exercise of her free will, when, from the aggravated nature of the offence, proved against the prisoner, the court may see no circumstances to render him or her proper object of mercy.

== Bengal government to the court of directors on sati (4 December 1829) ==
6. Your honourable court will be gratified by perceiving the great preponderance of opinions of the most intelligent and experienced of the civil and military officers consulted by the governor-general, in favour of the abolition of suttees, and of the perfect safety with which in their judgment the practice may be suppressed.

7. A few indeed were of opinion that it would be preferable to effect the abolition by the indirect interference of the magistrates and other public offices with the tacit sanction alone on the part of government, but we think there are very strong grounds against the policy of that mode of proceeding, independently of the embarrassing situation in which it would place the local officers, by allowing them to exercise a discretion in so delicate a matter. To use the words of the governor-general, we were decidedly in favour of an open avowed and general prohibition, resting altogether upon the moral goodness of the act, and our power to enforce it.

8. Your honourable court will observe that the original draft of the regulation was considerably modified before its final enactment, and that it was deemed advisable, at the suggestion of the judges of the nizamat adalat, to omit the distinction originally made between misdemeanour and culpable homicide, in being accessory to a suttee, and also in the degree of interference to be exercised by the police-officers. Upon the fullest consideration of the objections taken by the court, we determined that it would be better to leave the apportionment of punishment to be regulated by the commissioners of circuit, according to the nature and circumstances of each case, and that separate special instructions should be issued to the police-officers, as well as to the European authorities, to ensure a moderate and lenient exercise of the powers vested in them respectively by the regulation.

9. Finally, also, we were induced by the advice of the nizamat adalat to leave out a provision that the Mahomedan law-officers should not take any part in trials in cases of suttee. We were disposed to think that the attendance of the law-officers might be liable to misconstruction, and afford an opening to objections which it was desirable as much as possible to avoid; at the same time the opinion of the court against excepting the offence in question from the ordinary course of trial, was doubtless entitled to much weight, and upon the whole we were willing to be guided by their judgement in omitting the section altogether.

10. We beg to refer your honourable court to the enclosures contained in the letter from the registrar of the nizamat adalat under date the 3d instant (No. 21), for the special instructions above noticed, which have been issued to the commissioners of circuit, the magistrate, and the police-officers for their guidance.

11. In conclusion we venture to express a confident expectation that under the blessing of divine providence the important measure which we have deemed it our duty to adopt will be efficacious in putting down the abhorrent practice of suttee, a consummation, we feel persuaded, not less anxiously desired by your honourable court than by every preceding government of India, although the state of the country was less favourable in former times than at present, for its full and complete execution. It would be too much to expect that the promulgation of the abolition will not excite some degree of clamour and dissatisfaction, but we are firmly persuaded that such feelings will be short-lived, and we trust that no apprehension need be entertained of its exciting any violent opposition or any evil consequences whatever.

== See also ==
- Sati (Prevention) Act, 1987
