= Wariana =

Wariana is a village 4 kilometres (2.5 mi) west of Jalandhar in Punjab, India.

In August 2016, the Hindustan Times reported widespread typhoid as well as dengue fever and malaria there. With muddy roads and no sewerage facility, over 500 of Wariana's residents work as rag pickers, around 300 of them women and children, collecting plastic and metal from the garbage dump.

In January 2024, planned road, sewer, and other civic construction projects were announced.

== Climate ==
Wariana has a humid subtropical climate with cold winters 0 degree and hot summers 48 degree. Summers last from April to June and winters from November to February. The climate is dry on the whole, except during the brief southwest monsoon season during July and August. The average annual rainfall is about 70 cm.
