= Resident welfare association =

Type of Indian non-governmental organisation

A resident welfare association (frequently abbreviated as RWA) is a Non-governmental organization that represents the interests of the residents of a specific urban or suburban locality, particularly in Indian cities.

== Membership ==
Membership is voluntary, and the leadership is usually elected by fee-paying members. Members who do not pay the voluntary subscription fee in any year may not vote in the general body and other meetings of the association since they would be deemed to have opted out of membership in the voluntary association. Such associations cannot force residents to become members and pay annual or other fees, but they can suspend services to non-paying members. In some localities, such associations may bear the word "Development" in their nomenclature, such as development and welfare associations.

== Registration ==
RWAs are not official organs of government, and even slums and illegal housing localities in India can form RWAs to represent citizen interests. RWAs are typically registered under co-operative society acts, which require groups to have a minimum of fifteen members from a given area, or under the Apartment Owners Act of the state as "association of apartment owners", or under the Societies Registration Act (central Act or state Act), which requires a minimum of ten members. These acts also set the rules for the establishment of RWA bye-laws, which include such things as membership criteria, voting rights, and the conditions under which RWA officers can initiate legal proceedings on behalf of the registered society. Despite the prevalence of RWAs in slums and unauthorized colonies, however, government programs aimed at involving RWAs in strategic governance decisions, such as Delhi's Bhagidari Scheme, include only RWAs based on planned neighborhoods. RWAs have become increasingly involved in municipal politics and decision-making since the early 2000s and continue to grow in importance.

== See also ==
- Community-based organization
- NGO
