= Anirban Bhattacharyya =

Indian Bengali stage and film actor

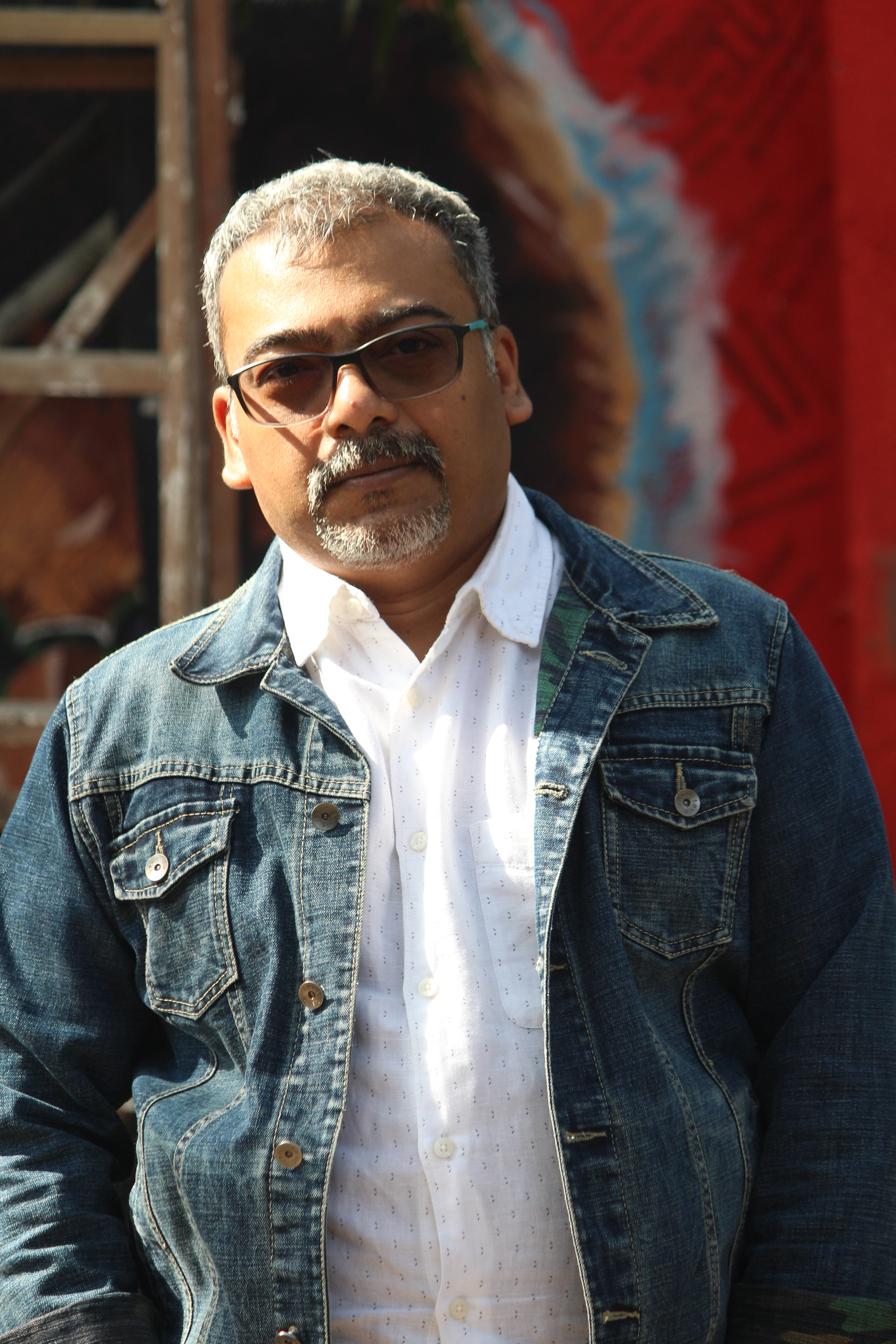
- Born: Kolkata, West Bengal
- Occupations: Author; television producer; actor; columnist
- Years active: 1998–present

Anirban Bhattacharyya is an Indian television producer, author, TEDx speaker and actor. He is the creator and producer of the true crime TV series Savdhaan India and Ishq Kills. He studied at Dr. Graham's Homes School at Kalimpong. He is an alumnus of St. Xavier's College Kolkata graduating with English Literature as Major. He went on to earn a master's degree in Mass Communication Film & television from the A.J.K. Mass Communication Research Centre New Delhi.

== Author ==
Bhattacharyya released his debut book entitled The Deadly Dozen: India's Most Notorious Serial Killers. The book was launched by film director Anurag Kashyap

Bhattacharyya's true crime book, India's Money Heist: The Chelembra Bank Robbery, was published by Penguin India. The book is about the Chelembra bank robbery and it was launched by actor Mohanlal. It is rumored that a film adaptation starring Mohanlal and Fahadh Faasil is in the making.

In 2023 he released his fifth book The hills are burning which is a memoir of his friends and him growing up in a boarding school in Kalimpong set against the genesis and the subsequent violence and human rights violations of the Gorkhaland movement of 1986.

In 2024, a campaign called 'Fit My Feet' about customised footwear for people inflicted with club feet that Anirban directed and co-produced for McCaan Worldgroup won Gold and Bronze at Cannes Lions International Festival of Creativity 2024

His book Swipe Right to Kill chronicles the details of the 2018 Jaipur Tinder murder case. Published by Penguin India, the book was released on 22 August 2024 on SoftCover.

After his true crime trilogy, Anirban published a collection of horror short stories called Enter At Your Own Risk.

== Television producer ==
Anirban created, produced, wrote, and directed the true crime television series Savdhaan India for Life OK, which subsequently became Star Bharat. He has also been the producer of Crime Patrol and Fear Files: Darr Ki Sacchi Tasvirein. He has directed shows at, and worked as Content Head at Channel V India.
