= Human sacrifice =

Ritualistic killing, usually as an offering

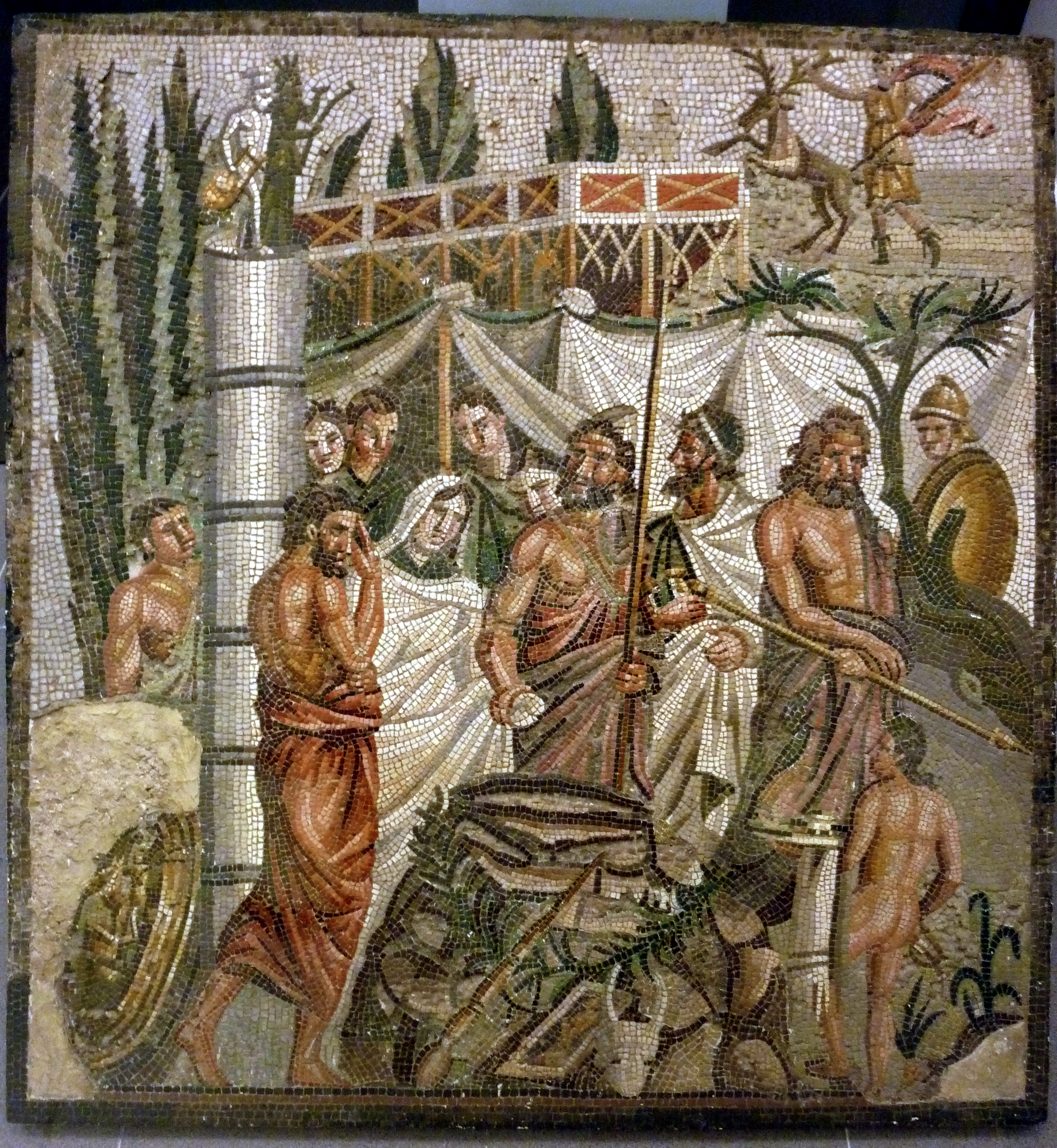
The Sacrifice of Iphigeneia, a depiction of a sacrificial procession on a mosaic from Roman Spain

Human sacrifice is the act of killing one or more humans as part of a ritual, which is typically intended to please or appease gods, a human ruler, public or jurisdictional demands for justice by capital punishment, an authoritative/priestly figure, spirits of dead ancestors, or as a retainer sacrifice, wherein a monarch's servants are killed in order for them to continue to serve their master in the next life. Closely related practices found in some tribal societies are cannibalism and headhunting. Human sacrifice is also known as ritual murder.

Human sacrifice was practiced in many societies, beginning in prehistoric times. By the Iron Age (1st millennium BCE), with the associated developments in religion (the Axial Age), human sacrifice was becoming less common throughout Africa, Europe, and Asia. During classical antiquity, it came to be looked down upon as barbaric. In the Americas, however, human sacrifice continued to be practiced, by some, to varying degrees until the European colonization of the Americas. Today, human sacrifice has become extremely rare.

Modern secular laws treat human sacrifices as murder. Most major religions in the modern day condemn the practice.

== Evolution and context ==
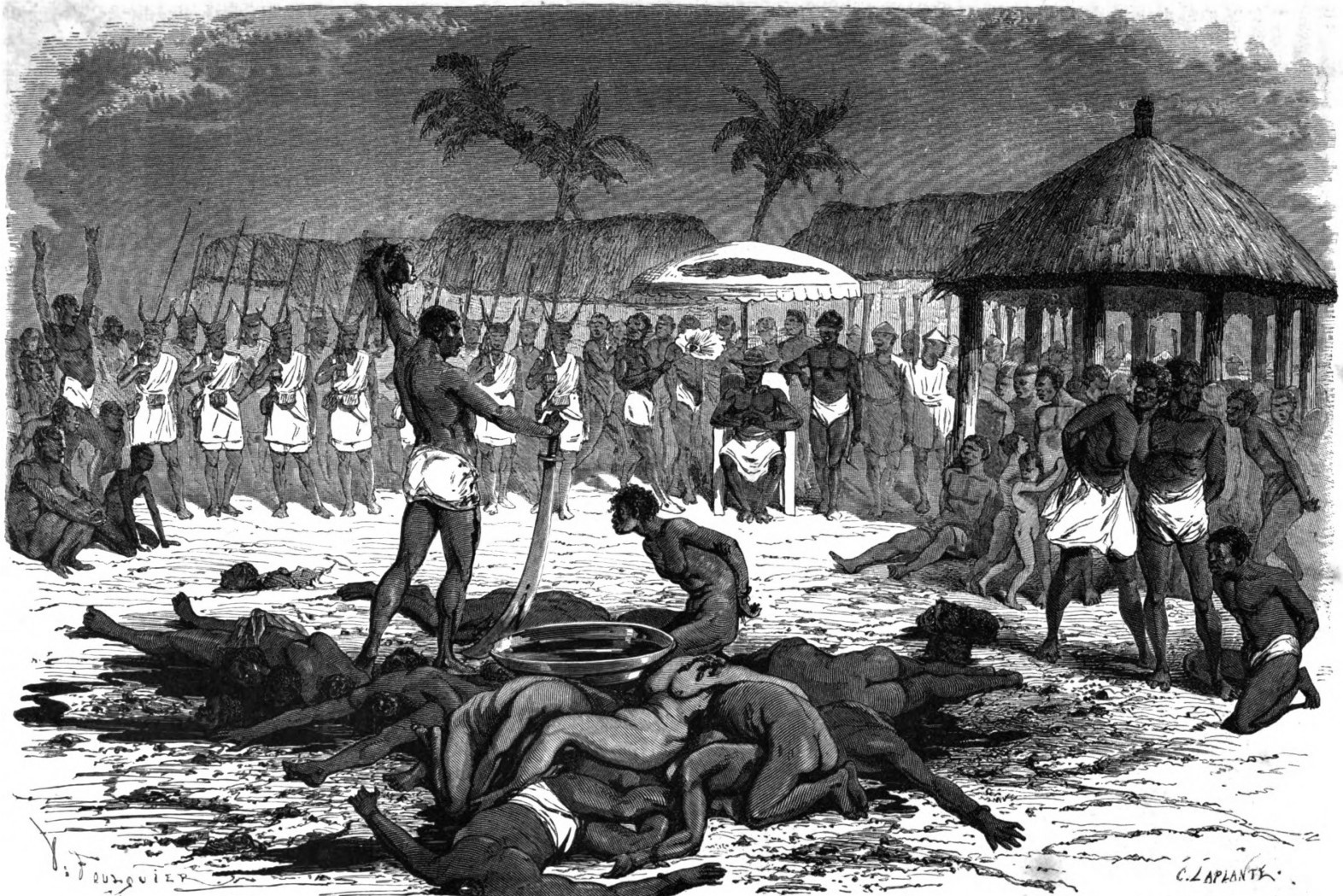
Human sacrifice in the kingdom of Dahomey

Human sacrifice has been practiced on a number of different occasions and in many different cultures. The various rationalisations behind human sacrifice are the same that motivate religious sacrifice in general. Human sacrifice is typically intended to bring good fortune and to pacify the gods, for example in the context of the dedication of a completed building like a temple or bridge. Fertility was another common theme in ancient religious sacrifices, such as sacrifices to the Aztec god of agriculture Xipe Totec.

In ancient Japan, legends talk about hitobashira ("human pillar"), in which people were buried alive at the base of or near some constructions to protect the buildings against disasters or enemy attacks, and almost identical accounts appear in the Balkans (The Building of Skadar and Bridge of Arta).

For the re-consecration of the Great Pyramid of Tenochtitlan in 1487, the Aztecs reported that they killed about 80,400 prisoners over the course of four days. According to Ross Hassig, author of Aztec Warfare, "between 10,000 and 80,400 persons" were sacrificed in the ceremony.

Human sacrifice can also have the intention of winning the gods' favor in warfare. In Homeric legend, Iphigeneia was to be sacrificed by her father Agamemnon to appease Artemis so she would allow the Greeks to wage the Trojan War.

In some notions of an afterlife, the deceased will benefit from victims killed at his funeral. Mongols, Scythians, early Egyptians and various Mesoamerican chiefs could take most of their household, including servants and concubines, with them to the next world. This is sometimes called a "retainer sacrifice", as the leader's retainers would be sacrificed along with their master, so that they could continue to serve him in the afterlife.

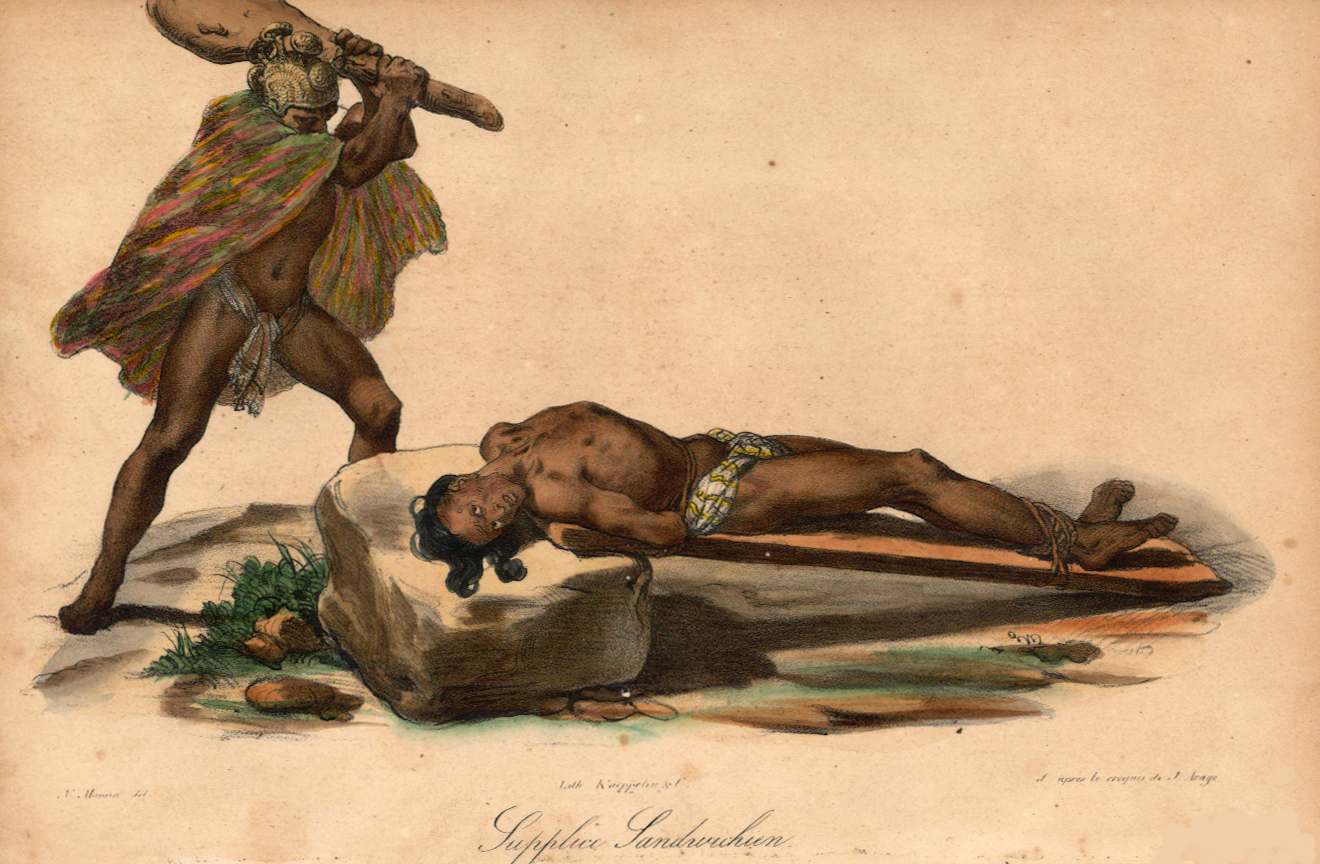
Hawaiian sacrifice, from Jacques Arago's account of Freycinet's travels around the world from 1817 to 1820

Another purpose is divination from the body parts of the victim. According to Strabo, Celts stabbed a victim with a sword and divined the future from his death spasms.

Headhunting is the practice of taking the head of a killed adversary, for ceremonial or magical purposes, or for reasons of prestige. It was found in many pre-modern tribal societies.

Human sacrifice may be a ritual practiced in a stable society, and may even be conducive to enhancing societal unity (see: Sociology of religion), both by creating a bond unifying the sacrificing community, and by combining human sacrifice and capital punishment, by removing individuals that have an adverse effect on societal stability (criminals, religious heretics, foreign slaves or prisoners of war). However, outside of civil religion, human sacrifice may also result in outbursts of blood frenzy and mass killings that destabilize society.

Many cultures show traces of prehistoric human sacrifice in their mythologies and religious texts, but ceased the practice before the onset of historical records. Some see the story of Abraham and Isaac (Genesis 22) as an example of an etiological myth, explaining the abolition of human sacrifice. The Vedic Purushamedha (literally "human sacrifice") is already a purely symbolic act in its earliest attestation. According to Pliny the Elder, human sacrifice in ancient Rome was abolished by a senatorial decree in 97 BCE, although by this time the practice had already become so rare that the decree was mostly a symbolic act. Human sacrifice once abolished is typically replaced by either animal sacrifice, or by the mock-sacrifice of effigies, such as the Argei in ancient Rome.

== History by region ==
=== Ancient Near East ===
Successful agricultural cities had already emerged in the Near East by the Neolithic, some protected behind stone walls. Jericho is the best known of these cities but other similar settlements existed along the coast of the Levant extending north into Asia Minor and west to the Tigris and Euphrates rivers. Most of the land was arid and the religious culture of the entire region centered on fertility and rain. Many of the religious rituals, including human sacrifice, had an agricultural focus. Blood was mixed with soil to improve its fertility.

==== Ancient Egypt ====
There may be evidence of retainer sacrifice in the early dynastic period at Abydos, when on the death of a King he would be accompanied by servants, and possibly high officials, who would continue to serve him in eternal life. The skeletons that were found had no obvious signs of trauma, leading to speculation that the giving up of life to serve the King may have been a voluntary act, possibly carried out in a drug-induced state. At about 2800 BCE, any possible evidence of such practices disappeared, though echoes are perhaps to be seen in the burial of statues of servants in Old Kingdom tombs.

Servants of both royalty and high court officials were slain to accompany their masters into the next world. The number of retainers buried surrounding the king's tomb was much greater than those of high court officials, however, again suggesting the greater importance of the pharaoh. For example, King Djer had 318 retainer sacrifices buried in his tomb, and 269 retainer sacrifices buried in enclosures surrounding his tomb.

==== Biblical accounts ====
References in the Bible point to an awareness of and disdain of human sacrifice in the history of ancient Near Eastern practice. During a battle with the Israelites, the King of Moab gives his firstborn son and heir as a whole burnt offering (olah, as used of the Temple sacrifice) (2 Kings 3:27). The Bible then recounts that, following the King's sacrifice, "There was great indignation [or wrath] against Israel" and that the Israelites had to raise their siege of the Moabite capital and go away. This verse had perplexed many later Jewish and Christian commentators, who tried to explain what the impact of the Moabite King's sacrifice was, to make those under siege emboldened while disheartening the Israelites, make God angry at the Israelites or the Israelites fear his anger, make Chemosh (the Moabite god) angry, or otherwise. Whatever the explanation, evidently at the time of writing, such an act of sacrificing the firstborn son and heir, while prohibited by Israelites (Deuteronomy 12:31; Deut. 18:9–12; Leviticus 18,22-23, about Moloch), was considered as an emergency measure in the Ancient Near East, to be performed in exceptional cases where divine favor was desperately needed.

Leviticus 27,29 prohibits redeeming those destined for sacrifice (Non redimatur, sed morte moriatur). This concerned offenders condemned to death by penal Herem, an anathema pronounced solemnly by God or authority, akin to the Roman sacratio.[17] Canaanites and Amorites were punished by God without possibility of redemption (Exodus 22; Deuteronomy 13; Judges 21).

The binding of Isaac appears in the Book of Genesis (22), where God tests Abraham by asking him to present his son as a sacrifice on Moriah. Abraham agrees to this command without arguing. The story ends with an angel stopping Abraham at the last minute and providing a ram, caught in some nearby bushes, to be sacrificed instead. Many Bible scholars have suggested this story's origin was a remembrance of an era when human sacrifice was abolished in favour of animal sacrifice.

Another probable instance of human sacrifice mentioned in the Bible is Jephthah's sacrifice of his daughter in Judges 11. Jephthah vows to sacrifice to God whatever comes to greet him at the door when he returns home if he is victorious in his war against the Ammonites. The vow is stated in the Book of Judges 11:31: "Then whoever comes of the doors of my house to meet me, when I return victorious from the Ammonites, shall be the Lord's, to be offered up by me as a burnt offering (NRSV)." When he returns from battle, his virgin daughter runs out to greet him, and Jephthah laments to her that he cannot take back his vow. She begs for, and is granted, "two months, so that I may go and wander on the mountains, and bewail my virginity, my companions and I", after which "[Jephthah] did with her according to the vow he had made." Jewish rabbis, Saint Jerome and Saint Augustine of Hippo state that the daughter of Jephthah was sacrificed, but not according to the will of the Judeo-Christian God, but in a cruel and arbitrary manner.

Two kings of Judah, Ahaz and Manassah, sacrificed their sons. Ahaz, in 2 Kings 16:3, sacrificed his son. "... He even made his son pass through fire, according to the abominable practices of the nations whom the LORD drove out before the people of Israel (NRSV)." King Manasseh sacrificed his sons in 2 Chronicles 33:6. "He made his son pass through fire in the valley of the son of Hinnom ... He did much evil in the sight of the Lord, provoking him to anger (NRSV)." The valley symbolized hell in later religions, such as Christianity, as a result.

1 Corinthians 10,20 affirms that Gentiles do sacrifices to demons and not to God.

==== Phoenicia ====
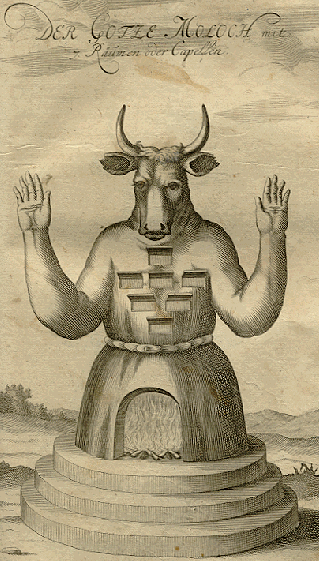
18th century depiction of the Moloch idol (Der Götze Moloch mit 7 Räumen oder Capellen. "The idol Moloch with seven chambers or chapels"), from Johann Lund's Die Alten Jüdischen Heiligthümer (1711, 1738)

According to Roman and Greek sources, Phoenicians and Carthaginians sacrificed infants to their gods. The bones of numerous infants have been found in Carthaginian archaeological sites in modern times, but their cause of death remain controversial. In a single child cemetery called the "Tophet" by archaeologists, an estimated 20,000 urns were deposited.

Plutarch (c. 46 – c. 120 CE) mentions the practice, as do Tertullian, Orosius, Diodorus Siculus and Philo. Livy and Polybius do not. The Bible asserts that children were sacrificed at a place called the tophet ("roasting place") to the god Moloch. According to Diodorus Siculus's Bibliotheca historica, "There was in their city a bronze image of Cronus extending its hands, palms up and sloping toward the ground, so that each of the children when placed thereon rolled down and fell into a sort of gaping pit filled with fire."

Plutarch, however, claims that the children were already dead at the time, having been killed by their parents, whose consent – as well as that of the children – was required. Tertullian explains the acquiescence of the children as a product of their youthful trustfulness.

The accuracy of such stories is disputed by some modern historians and archaeologists.

==== Mesopotamia ====
Retainer sacrifice was practised within the royal tombs of ancient Mesopotamia. Courtiers, guards, musicians, handmaidens, and grooms were presumed to have committed ritual suicide by taking poison. A 2009 examination of skulls from the royal cemetery at Ur, discovered in Iraq in the 1920s by a team led by C. Leonard Woolley, appears to support a more grisly interpretation of human sacrifices associated with elite burials in ancient Mesopotamia than had previously been recognized. Palace attendants, as part of royal mortuary ritual, were not dosed with poison to meet death serenely. Instead, they were put to death by having a sharp instrument, such as a pike, driven into their heads.

=== Europe ===
==== Neolithic Europe ====
There is archaeological evidence of human sacrifice in Neolithic and Eneolithic Europe.

At Herxheim in southwestern Germany, a Linear Pottery culture enclosure dating to the fifth millennium BCE contained the fragmented remains of more than 1,000 individuals. Their remains show extensive post-mortem processing, including dismemberment and evidence interpreted by some researchers as ritual cannibalism. Whether the victims were war captives, sacrificial victims or participants in other forms of ritual violence remains debated.

==== Greco-Roman antiquity ====
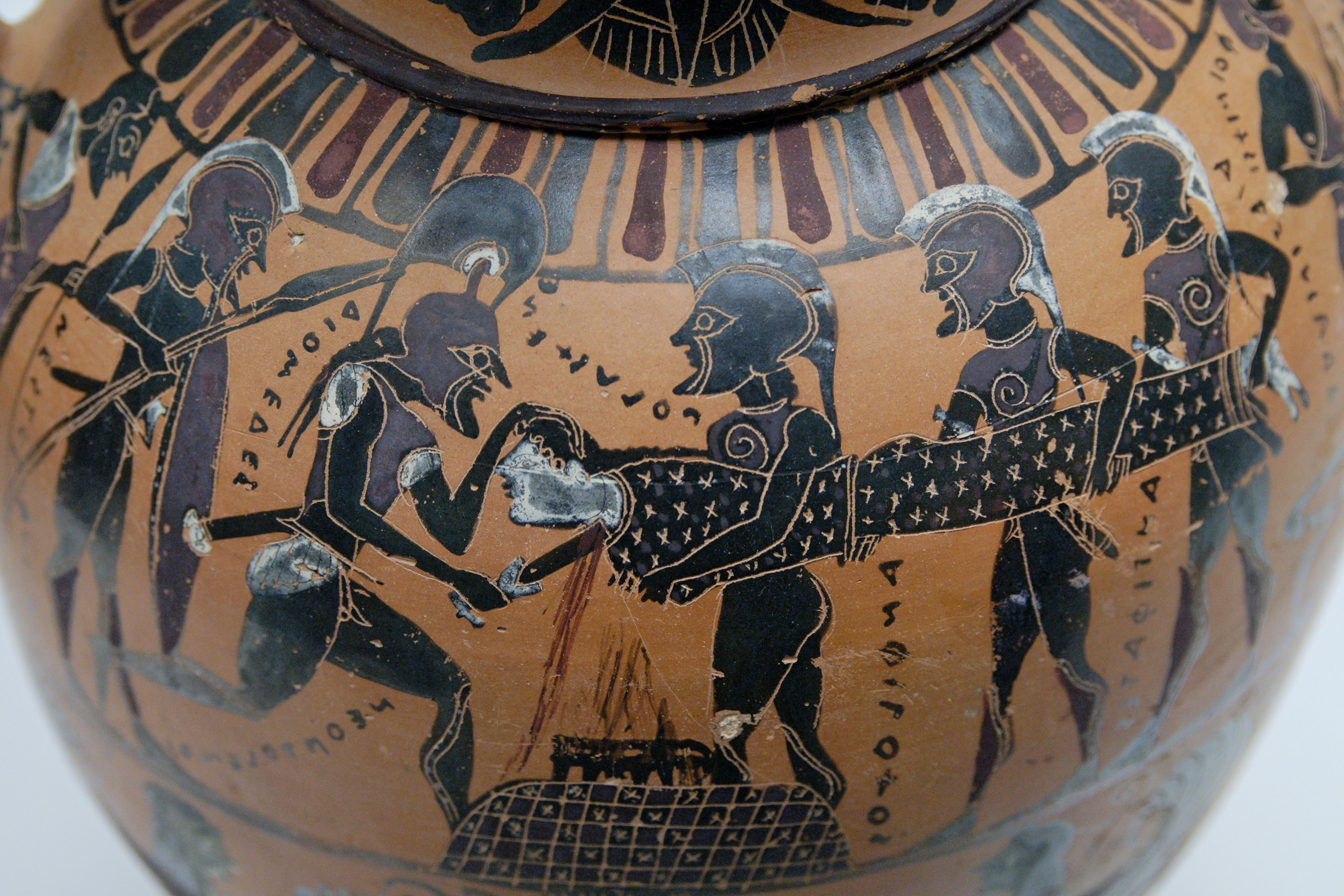
The mythological sacrifice of Polyxena by the triumphant Greeks at the end of the Trojan War

The ancient ritual of expelling certain slaves, disabled individuals, or criminals from a community to ward off disaster (known as pharmakos), would at times involve publicly executing the chosen prisoner by throwing them off of a cliff.

References to human sacrifice can be found in Greek historical accounts as well as mythology. The human sacrifice in mythology, the deus ex machina salvation in some versions of Iphigenia (who was about to be sacrificed by her father Agamemnon) and her replacement with a deer by the goddess Artemis, may be a vestigial memory of the abandonment and discrediting of the practice of human sacrifice among the Greeks in favour of animal sacrifice. In another myth that serves as a doublet of the Iphigenia story, Artemis demanded the sacrifice of Melanippus and her priestess Comaetho, who had defiled her temple.

In ancient Rome, human sacrifice was infrequent but documented. Roman authors often contrast their own behavior with that of people who would commit the heinous act of human sacrifice, as human sacrifice was often looked down upon. These authors make it clear that such practices were from a much more uncivilized time in the past, far removed. It is thought that many ritualistic celebrations and dedications to gods used to involve human sacrifice but have now been replaced with symbolic offerings. Dionysius of Halicarnassus says that the ritual of the Argei, in which straw figures were tossed into the Tiber river, may have been a substitute for an original offering of elderly men. Cicero claimed that puppets thrown from the Pons Sublicius by the Vestal Virgins in a processional ceremony were substitutes for the past sacrifice of old men.

After the Roman defeat at Cannae, two Gauls and two Greeks in male-female couples were buried under the Forum Boarium, in a stone chamber used for the purpose at least once before. This was prescribed in the Sibylline Books. In Livy's description of these sacrifices, he distances the practice from Roman tradition and asserts that the past human sacrifices evident in the same location were "wholly alien to the Roman spirit." The rite was apparently repeated in 113 BCE, preparatory to an invasion of Gaul. They buried the two Greeks and the two Gauls alive as a plea to the gods to save Rome from destruction at the hands of Hannibal.

According to Pliny the Elder, human sacrifice was banned by law during the consulship of Publius Licinius Crassus and Gnaeus Cornelius Lentulus in 97 BCE, although by this time it was so rare that the decree was largely symbolic. Sulla's Lex Cornelia de sicariis et veneficis in 82 BC also included punishments for human sacrifice. The Romans also had traditions that centered around ritual murder, but which they did not consider to be sacrifice. Such practices included burying unchaste Vestal Virgins alive and drowning visibly intersex children. These were seen as reactions to extraordinary circumstances as opposed to being part of Roman tradition. Vestal Virgins who were accused of being unchaste were put to death, and a special chamber was built to bury them alive. This aim was to please the gods and restore balance to Rome. (Note: Burying the convicted unchaste vestal in a sealed underground chamber was also a way to impose capital punishment on her for criminally endangering the city by her religious violation, without violating her still-sacred status: Among other prohibitions, no-one could touch her person.) Human sacrifices, in the form of burying individuals alive, were not uncommon during times of panic in ancient Rome. However, the burial of unchaste Vestal Virgins was also practiced in times of peace. Their chasteness was thought to be a safeguard of the city, and even in punishment, the state of their bodies was preserved in order to maintain the peace.

Captured enemy leaders were only occasionally executed at the conclusion of a Roman triumph, and the Romans themselves did not consider these deaths a sacrificial offering. Gladiator combat was thought by the Romans to have originated as fights to the death among war captives at the funerals of Roman generals, and Christian polemicists, such as Tertullian, considered deaths in the arena to be little more than human sacrifice. Over time, participants became criminals and slaves, and their death was considered a sacrifice to the Manes on behalf of the dead.

Political rumors sometimes centered around sacrifice and in doing so, aimed to liken individuals to barbarians and show that the individual had become uncivilized. Human sacrifice also became a marker and defining characteristic of magic and bad religion.

==== Carthage ====
Ancient Greek and Roman authors reported that Carthaginians practiced infant sacrifice, and the question has been the subject of continuing archaeological debate. At the Tophet at Carthage, archaeologists have found thousands of urns containing cremated remains of very young children and animals. Some scholars have argued that the age distribution of the children and other archaeological evidence support the interpretation of the Tophet as a site of infant sacrifice, while others have argued that the remains are more consistent with a cemetery for infants who died of natural causes or other causes of mortality.

==== Celtic peoples ====
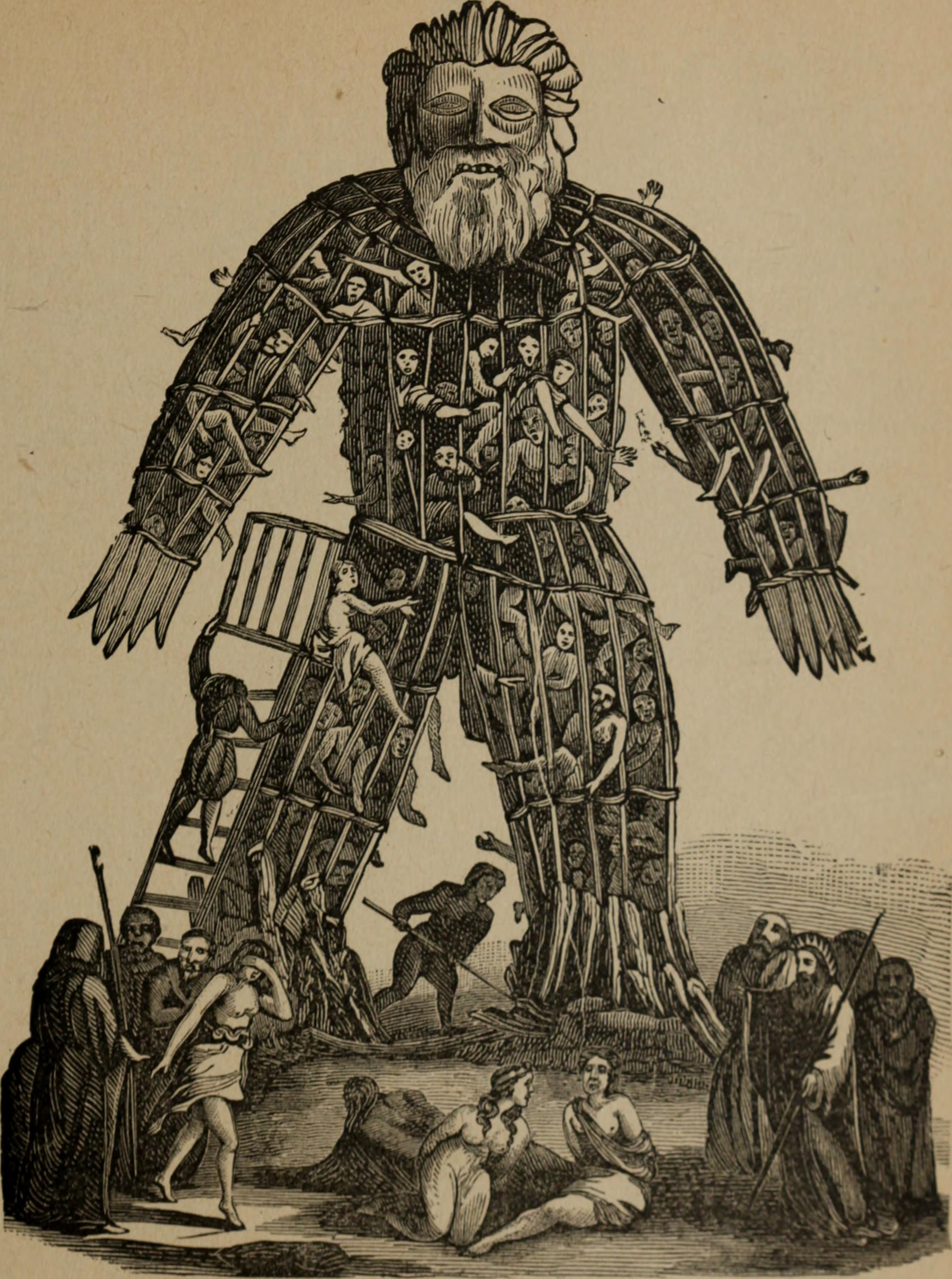
A 19th century depiction of a wicker man

There is some evidence that ancient Celtic peoples practiced human sacrifice. Accounts of Celtic human sacrifice come from Roman and Greek sources. Julius Caesar and Strabo wrote that the Gauls burnt animal and human sacrifices in a large wickerwork figure, known as a wicker man, and said the human victims were usually criminals; while Posidonius wrote that druids who oversaw human sacrifices foretold the future by watching the death throes of the victims. Caesar also wrote that slaves of Gaulish chiefs would be burnt along with the body of their master as part of his funeral rites. In the 1st century AD, Roman writer Lucan mentioned human sacrifices to the Gaulish gods Esus, Teutatis and Taranis. In a 9th-century commentary on Lucan, an unnamed author added that sacrifices to Esus were hanged from a tree, those to Teutates were drowned, and those to Taranis were burned. According to the 2nd-century Roman writer Cassius Dio, Boudica's forces impaled Roman captives during her rebellion against the Roman occupation, to the accompaniment of revelry and sacrifices in the sacred groves of Andate. However, the Romans benefited from making the Celts sound barbaric, and scholars are more skeptical about these accounts now than in the past.

There is some archaeological evidence of human sacrifice among Celtic peoples, although it is rare. Ritual beheading and headhunting was a major religious and cultural practice that has found copious support in the archaeological record, including the numerous skulls found in Londinium's River Walbrook and the twelve headless corpses at the Gaulish sanctuary of Gournay-sur-Aronde. (Note: French archaeologist Jean-Louis Brunaux has written extensively on human sacrifice and the sanctuaries of Belgic Gaul.)

Several ancient Irish bog bodies have been interpreted as kings who were ritually killed, presumably after serious crop failures or other disasters. Some were deposited in bogs on territorial boundaries (which were seen as liminal places) or near royal inauguration sites, and some were found to have eaten a ceremonial last meal. Some academics suggest there are allusions to kings being sacrificed in Irish mythology, particularly in tales of threefold deaths.

The medieval Dindsenchas (Lore of Places) says that, in pagan Ireland, first-born children were sacrificed at an idol called Crom Cruach, whose worship was ended by Saint Patrick. However, this account was written by Christian scribes centuries after the supposed events and may be based on biblical traditions about the god Moloch.

In Britain, the medieval legends of Dinas Emrys and of Saint Oran of Iona mention foundation sacrifices, whereby people were ritually killed and buried under foundations to ensure the building's safety. The Waldensians sect was later accused of child sacrifice by the Church.

==== Baltic peoples ====
According to written sources from the 13th–14th centuries, the Lithuanians and Prussians made sacrifices to their pagan gods at their sacred places, alka hills, battlefields and near natural objects (sea, rivers, lakes, etc.). In 1389 following the military victories in the land of Medininkai the Samogitians cast lots which indicated Marquard von Raschau, the commander of Klaipėda (Memel), as a suitable victim for gods and burnt him on horseback in full armour. It possibly was the last human sacrifice in medieval Europe.

==== Finnic peoples ====
Pope Gregory IX described in a papal letter how the Tavastians in Finland sacrificed Christians to their pagan gods: "The little children, to whom the light of Christ was revealed in baptism, they violently tore from this light and killed, and adult men, after pulling out their entrails, they sacrifice them to evil spirits and force others to run around trees until death, and some of the priests they blind, from others they brutally sever their hands and other limbs and wrap what is left behind in straws and burn them alive."

There have been found bog graves in Estonia that have been interpreted to have been part of human sacrifice. According to Aliis Moora, mostly enemy prisoners of war were sacrificed, the main reason indicated in the Livonian Chronicle as alleviating crop failure. Sacrifices were also performed as a show of gratitude after a victorious battle. Ritual cannibalism also took place, in order to gain the power of the enemy. The Gesta Hammaburgensis ecclesiae pontificum by Adam of Bremen written at the end of the 11th century claims that behind the island of Kuramaa there is an island called Aestland (Estonia), whose inhabitants do not believe in the Christian God. Instead, they worship dragons and birds (dracones adorant cum volucribus) to whom people bought from slavers are sacrificed. According to the Livonian Chronicle, describing the events after the Battle of Ümera, "Estonians had seized some Germans, Livs, and Latvians, and some of them they simply killed, others they burned alive and tore the shirts off some of them, carved crosses on their backs with a sword and then beheaded". The Chronicle explicitly states they were sacrificed "to their gods" (diis suis).

==== Germanic peoples ====
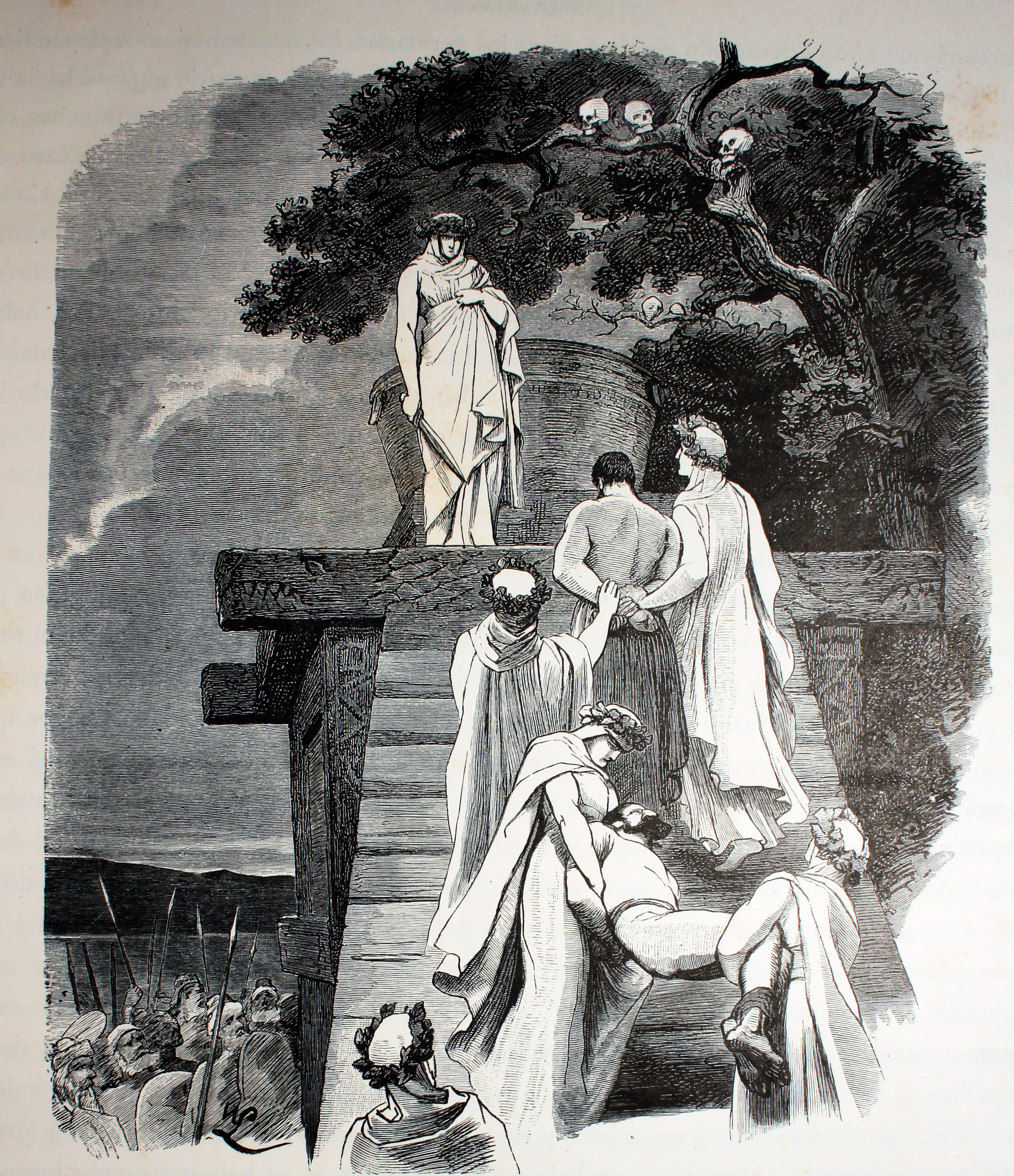
Cimbrian seeresses performing human sacrifice, from Germania by Johannes Scherr.

Human sacrifice was not particularly common among the Germanic peoples, being resorted to in exceptional situations arising from environmental crises (crop failure, drought, famine) or social crises (war), often thought to derive at least in part from the failure of the king to establish or maintain prosperity and peace (árs ok friðar) in the lands entrusted to him. In later Scandinavian practice, human sacrifice appears to have become more institutionalised and was repeated periodically as part of a larger sacrifice (according to Adam of Bremen, every nine years).

Evidence of human sacrifice by Germanic pagans before the Viking Age depend on archaeology and on a few accounts in Greco-Roman ethnography. Roman writer Tacitus reported the Suebians making human sacrifices to gods he interpreted as Mercury and Isis. He also claimed that Germans sacrificed Roman commanders and officers as a thanksgiving for victory in the Battle of the Teutoburg Forest. Jordanes reported the Goths sacrificing prisoners of war to Mars, suspending the victims' severed arms from tree branches. Tacitus further refers to those who have transgressed certain societal rules being drowned and placed in wetlands. This potentially explains finds of bog bodies dating to the Roman Iron Age although none show signs of having died by drowning.

By the 10th century, Germanic paganism had become restricted to the Norse people. One account by Ahmad ibn Fadlan in 922 claims Varangian warriors were sometimes buried with enslaved women, in the belief they would become their wives in Valhalla. He describes the funeral of a Varangian chieftain, in which a slave girl volunteered to be buried with him. After ten days of festivities, she was given an intoxicating drink, repeatedly raped by other chiefs, stabbed to death by a priestess, and burnt together with the dead chieftain in his boat (see ship burial). This practice is evidenced archaeologically, with many male warrior burials (such as the ship burial at Balladoole on the Isle of Man, or that at Oseberg in Norway) also containing female remains with signs of trauma.

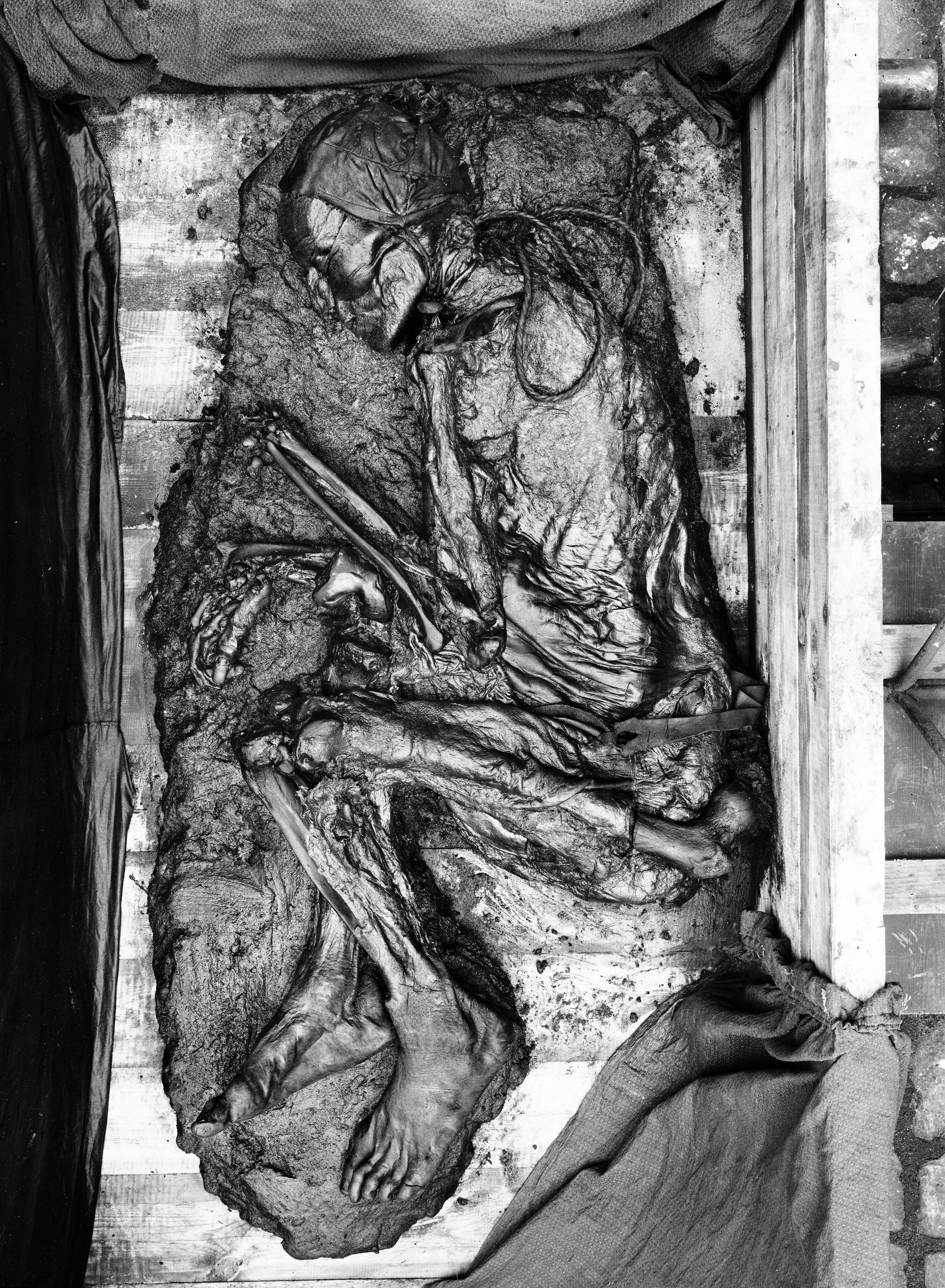
The remains of the Tollund Man shortly after his discovery in 1950.

According to Adémar de Chabannes, just before his death in 932 or 933, Rollo (founder and first ruler of the Viking Duchy of Normandy) performed human sacrifices to appease the pagan gods while at the same time giving gifts to the churches in Normandy.

In the 11th century, Adam of Bremen wrote that human and animal sacrifices were made at the Temple at Gamla Uppsala in Sweden. He wrote that every ninth year, nine men and nine of every animal were sacrificed and their bodies hung in a sacred grove.

The Historia Norwegiæ and Ynglinga saga refer to the willing sacrifice of King Dómaldi after bad harvests. The same saga also relates that Dómaldi's descendant king Aun sacrificed nine of his own sons to Odin in exchange for longer life, until the Swedes stopped him from sacrificing his last son, Egil.

In the Saga of Hervor and Heidrek, Heidrek agrees to the sacrifice of his son in exchange for command over half the army of Reidgotaland. With this, he seizes the whole kingdom and prevents the sacrifice of his son, dedicating those fallen in his rebellion to Odin instead.

==== Slavic peoples ====
In the 10th century, Persian explorer Ahmad ibn Rustah described funerary rites for the Rus' (Scandinavian Norsemen traders in northeastern Europe) including the sacrifice of a young female slave. Leo the Deacon describes prisoner sacrifice by the Rus' led by Sviatoslav during the Russo-Byzantine War "in accordance with their ancestral custom."

According to the 12th-century Primary Chronicle, prisoners of war were sacrificed to the supreme Slavic deity Perun. Sacrifices to pagan gods, along with paganism itself, were banned after the Christianization of Rus' by Grand Prince Vladimir the Great in the 980s.

In 1066, the Bishop of Mecklenburg John Scotus was sacrificed to Radegast in Rethra by the Slavic Lutici.

Archaeological findings indicate that the practice may have been widespread, at least among slaves, judging from mass graves containing the cremated fragments of a number of different people.

=== East Asia ===
==== China ====
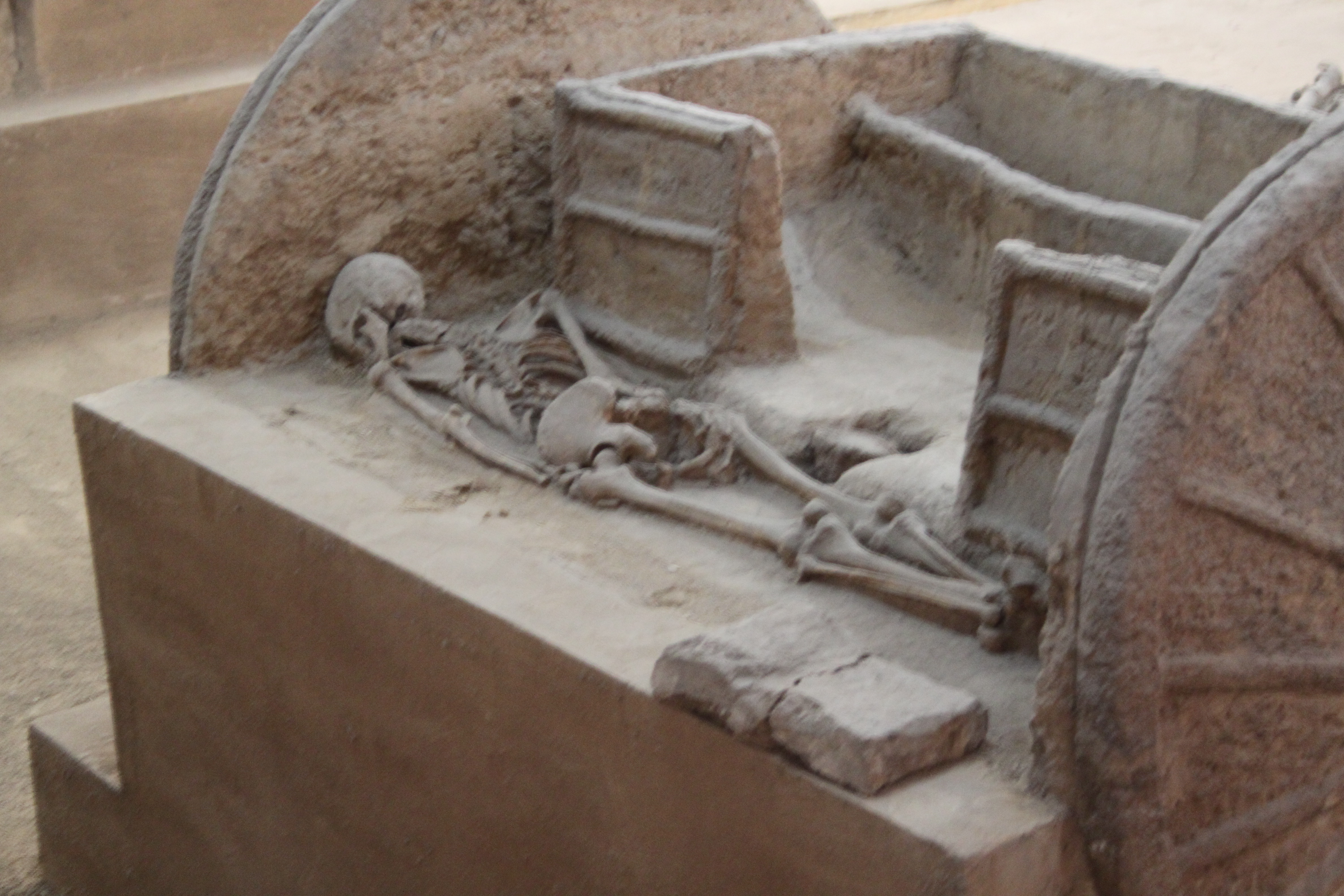
Human sacrifice from the Shang dynasty in China

The history of human sacrifice in China may extend as early as 2300 BCE. Excavations of the ancient fortress city of Shimao in the northern part of modern Shaanxi province revealed 80 skulls ritually buried underneath the city's eastern wall. Forensic analysis indicates the victims were all teenage girls. Human sacrifices were also documented in the Qijia culture.

The ancient Chinese are known to have made drowned sacrifices of men and women to the river god Hebo. They also have buried slaves alive with their owners upon death as part of a funeral service. This was especially prevalent during the Shang and Zhou dynasties. The Shang practised large-scale human sacrifice, a practice deriving from their belief in the afterlife. At least 14,197 human victims were mentioned in inscriptions. During the Warring States period, Ximen Bao of Wei outlawed human sacrificial practices to the river god. In Chinese lore, Ximen Bao is regarded as a folk hero who pointed out the absurdity of human sacrifice.

The sacrifice of a high-ranking person's slaves, concubines, servants, guards, or other retainers upon his death was a form of retainer sacrifice intended to accompany or serve the deceased in the afterlife. In Chinese sources, such practices are associated with terms including 人殉 and xun zang (殉葬). The methods varied across periods and contexts, including violent killing, burial alive, and coerced suicide.

Funeral human sacrifice was widely practiced in the ancient Chinese state of Qin. According to the Records of the Grand Historian by Han dynasty historian Sima Qian, the practice was started by Duke Wu, the tenth ruler of Qin, who had 66 people buried with him in 678 BCE. The 14th ruler Duke Mu had 177 people buried with him in 621 BCE, including three senior government officials. Afterwards, the people of Qin wrote the famous poem Yellow Bird to condemn this barbaric practice, later compiled in the Confucian Classic of Poetry. The tomb of the 18th ruler Duke Jing of Qin, who died in 537 BCE, has been excavated. More than 180 coffins containing the remains of 186 victims were found in the tomb. The practice would continue until Duke Xian of Qin (424–362 BCE) abolished it in 384 BCE. Modern historian Ma Feibai considers the significance of Duke Xian's abolition of human sacrifice in Chinese history comparable to that of Abraham Lincoln's abolition of slavery in American history.

After the abolition of human sacrifice in Qin, the practice became relatively uncommon in much of central China, but it was revived under the early Ming dynasty. When the Hongwu Emperor's second son died in 1395, two of his concubines were sacrificed and interred with him. When Hongwu himself died in 1398, forty minor consorts were sacrificed with him. After the death of the Yongle Emperor in 1424, more than thirty palace women, including sixteen concubines, were likewise forced to die with him. The Tianshun Emperor abolished the practice for Ming emperors and princes in 1464.

Human sacrifice associated with rulers' burials also persisted among the early Manchus. Following Nurhaci's death in 1626, his principal consort Lady Abahai was forced to commit suicide and was buried with him, with historical sources giving differing accounts of the circumstances of her death. Human sacrifice involving servants or slaves persisted into the early Qing period until it was prohibited under the Kangxi Emperor in 1673.

==== Japan ====
In the practice known as Hitobashira (人柱, "human pillar"), a person was buried alive at the base of large structures such as dams, castles, and bridges.

==== Tibet ====
Human sacrifice was practiced in Tibet prior to the arrival of Buddhism in the 7th century. (Note: "Human sacrifice seems undoubtedly to have been regularly practised in Tibet up till the dawn there of Buddhism in the seventh century.") Historical practices such as burying bodies under the cornerstones of houses may have been practiced during the medieval era, but few concrete instances have been recorded or verified.

The prevalence of human sacrifice in medieval Buddhist Tibet is less clear. The Lamas, as professing Buddhists, could not condone blood sacrifices, and they replaced the human victims with effigies made from dough which is still to this day dyed partially red to symbolize sacrifice. This replacement of human victims with effigies is attributed to Padmasambhava, a Tibetan saint of the mid-8th century, in Tibetan tradition.

Nevertheless, there is some evidence that outside of orthodox Buddhism, there were practices of tantric human sacrifice which survived throughout the medieval period, and possibly into modern times. The 15th century Blue Annals reports that in the 13th century so-called "18 robber-monks" slaughtered men and women in their ceremonies. Grunfeld (1996) concludes that it cannot be ruled out that isolated instances of human sacrifice did survive in remote areas of Tibet until the mid-20th century, but they must have been rare. Grunfeld also notes that Tibetan practices unrelated to human sacrifice, such as the use of human bone in ritual instruments, have been depicted without evidence as products of human sacrifice.

=== Indian subcontinent ===
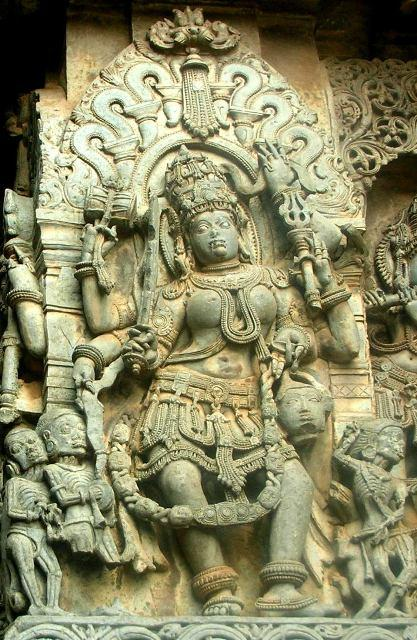
Fierce goddesses like Chamunda are recorded to have been offered human sacrifice.

In India, human sacrifice is mainly known as Narabali. It takes place in some parts of India mostly to find lost treasure. In Maharashtra, the government made it illegal to practice with the Anti-Superstition and Black Magic Act. Currently human sacrifice is very rare in modern India. There have been at least three cases through 2003–2013 where men have been murdered allegedly in the name of human sacrifice.

Regarding possible Vedic mention of human sacrifice, the prevailing 19th-century view, associated above all with Henry Colebrooke, was that human sacrifice did not actually take place. Those verses which referred to purushamedha were meant to be read symbolically, or as a "priestly fantasy". However, Rajendralal Mitra published a defence of the thesis that human sacrifice, as had been practised in Bengal, was a continuation of traditions dating back to Vedic periods. Hermann Oldenberg held to Colebrooke's view; but Jan Gonda underlined its disputed status.

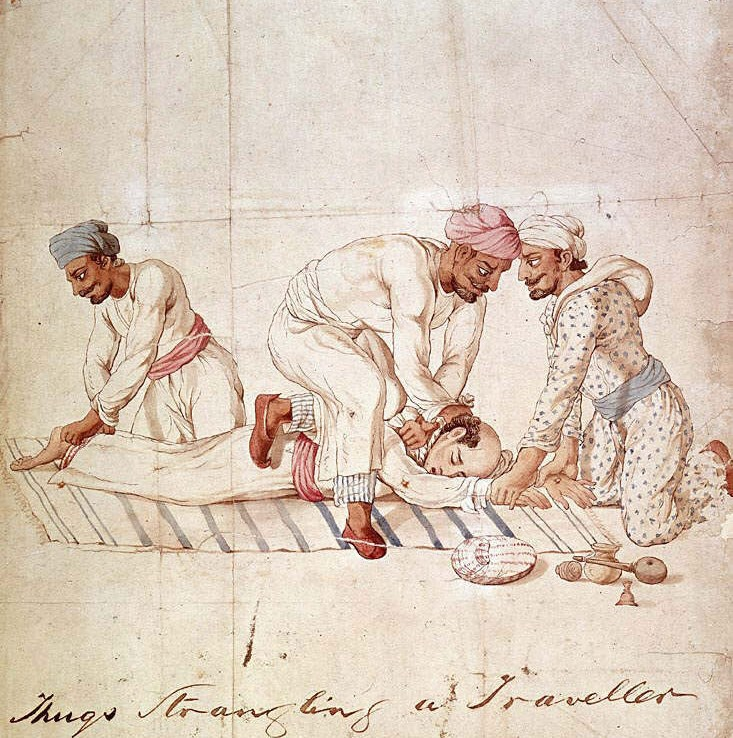
A group of Thugs strangling a traveller on a highway in India in the early 19th century.

Human and animal sacrifice became less common during the post-Vedic period, as ahimsa (non-violence) became part of mainstream religious thought. The Chandogya Upanishad (3.17.4) includes ahimsa in its list of virtues. The impact of Sramanic religions such as Buddhism and Jainism also became known in the Indian subcontinent.

In the 7th century, Banabhatta, in a description of the dedication of a temple of Chandika, describes a series of human sacrifices; similarly, in the 9th century, Haribhadra describes the sacrifices to Chandika in Odisha. The town of Kuknur in North Karnataka there exists an ancient Kali temple, built around the 8-9th century CE, which has a history of human sacrifices. Human sacrifice is reputed to have been performed on the altars of the Hatimura Temple, a Shakti (Great Goddess) temple located at Silghat, in the Nagaon district of Assam. It was built during the reign of king Pramatta Singha in 1667 Sakabda (1745–1746 CE). It used to be an important center of Shaktism in ancient Assam. Its presiding goddess is Durga in her aspect of Mahisamardini, slayer of the demon Mahisasura. It was also performed in the Tamresari Temple which was located in Sadiya under the Chutia kings.

Nineteenth-century illustration depicting a human sacrifice ritual (known as Meriah) among the Khond people of India

Open human sacrifices were carried out in connection with the worship of Shakti until approximately the early modern period, and in Bengal perhaps as late as the early 19th century. Although not accepted by larger section of Hindu culture certain Tantric cults performed human sacrifice until around the same time, both actual and symbolic; it was a highly ritualised act, and on occasion took many months to complete. An occasional ritual murder, to Kali, periodically appears in the contemporary press.

The free or forced burning of widows, in a Vedic practise known as Sati, was noted during Alexander's invasion, of 327 BCE. A practice that was codified during the Gupta empire, and later prohibited, in Bengal via Bengal Sati Regulation, 1829, later across India, the last explicit legislation, in India, being the Sati (Prevention) Act, 1987.

=== Pacific ===
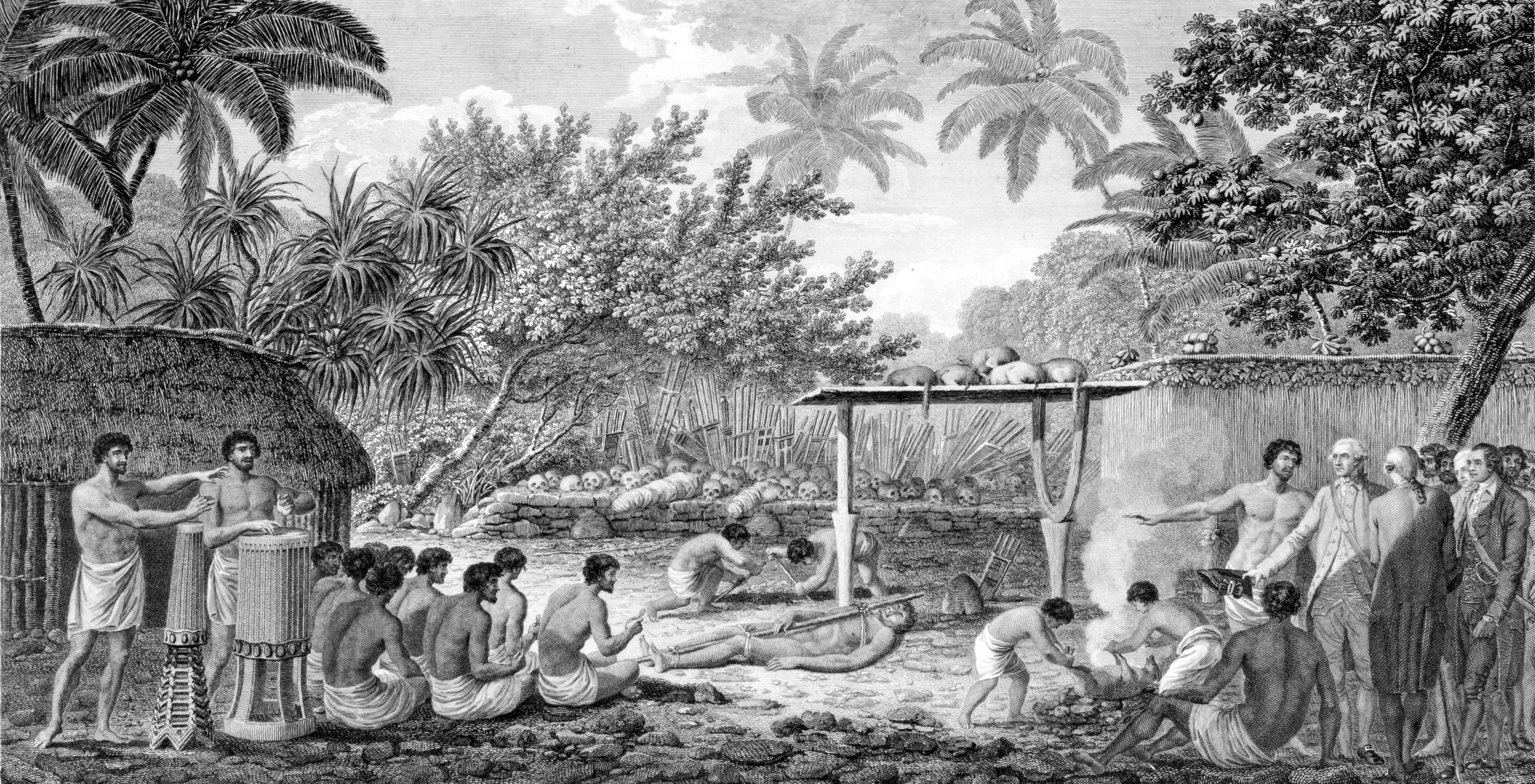
Captain James Cook and his officers (right) witnessing a human sacrifice to the war god ʻOro at a marae in Tahiti, September 1777

In Tahiti, human sacrifice was performed in connection with warfare and chiefly power. In 1777, during James Cook's visit, a Tahitian chief, Tina, offered one of his servants as a sacrifice to the war god ʻOro before a military campaign against a rival chief. The victim was buried beneath the marae.

Human sacrifice was also practiced in Tonga. Meredith Filihia has described sacrifice there as a religious and political practice associated with chiefly power. An 1817 account by William Mariner describes the strangulation of children as a sacrifice intended to help seriously ill relatives recover, as well as the former practice of strangling the principal wife of the Tuʻi Tonga at her husband's funeral.

In the Marquesas Islands, historical accounts describe human sacrifices to the gods in which victims were obtained from neighbouring settlements. One early ethnographic account states that the death of a high-ranking priest required three victims. Two were hung at the marae while the third was killed and eaten by participants in the ceremony.

In Hawaii, human sacrifice was associated particularly with the luakini heiau, temples dedicated to the war god Kū. The victims could include war captives, kauwā from the outcast class, lawbreakers and defeated political opponents. Some accounts indicate that war captives and kapu violators were among the usual victims at luakini ceremonies. During Kamehameha I's struggle for control of Hawaiʻi Island, his rival Keōua Kuahuʻula was killed and his body was offered as the principal sacrifice at Puʻukoholā Heiau. Several of Keōua's companions were also killed.

=== Pre-Columbian Americas ===
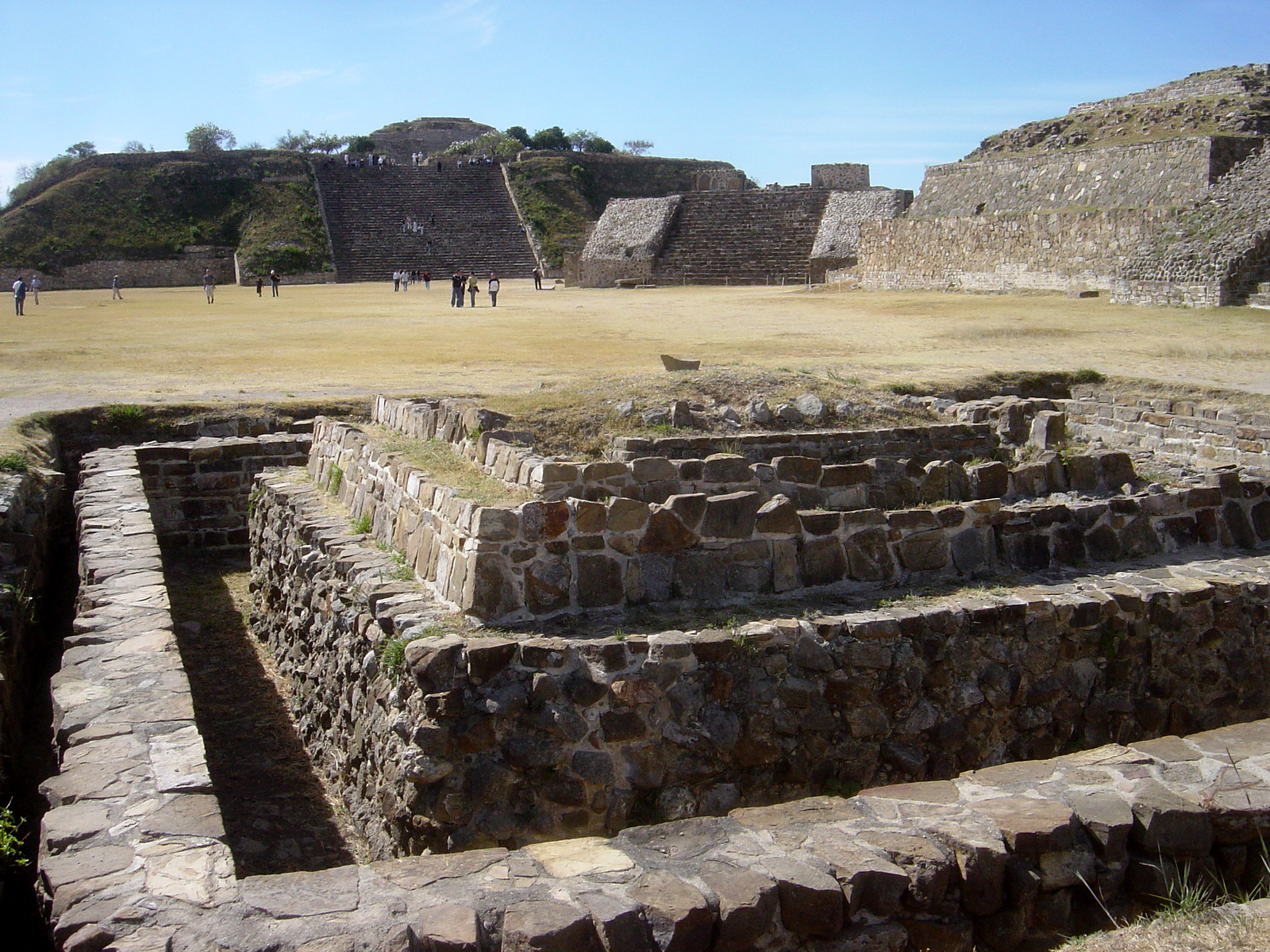
Altar for human sacrifice at Monte Albán

Some of the most famous forms of ancient human sacrifice were performed by various Pre-Columbian civilizations in the Americas that included the sacrifice of prisoners as well as voluntary sacrifice. Friar Marcos de Niza (1539), writing of the Chichimecas, said that from time to time "they of this valley cast lots whose luck (honour) it shall be to be sacrificed, and they make him great cheer, on whom the lot falls, and with great joy they lund him with flowers upon a bed prepared in the said ditch all full of flowers and sweet herbs, on which they lay him along, and lay great store of dry wood on both sides of him, and set it on fire on either part, and so he dies" and "that the victim took great pleasure" in being sacrificed.

==== North America ====
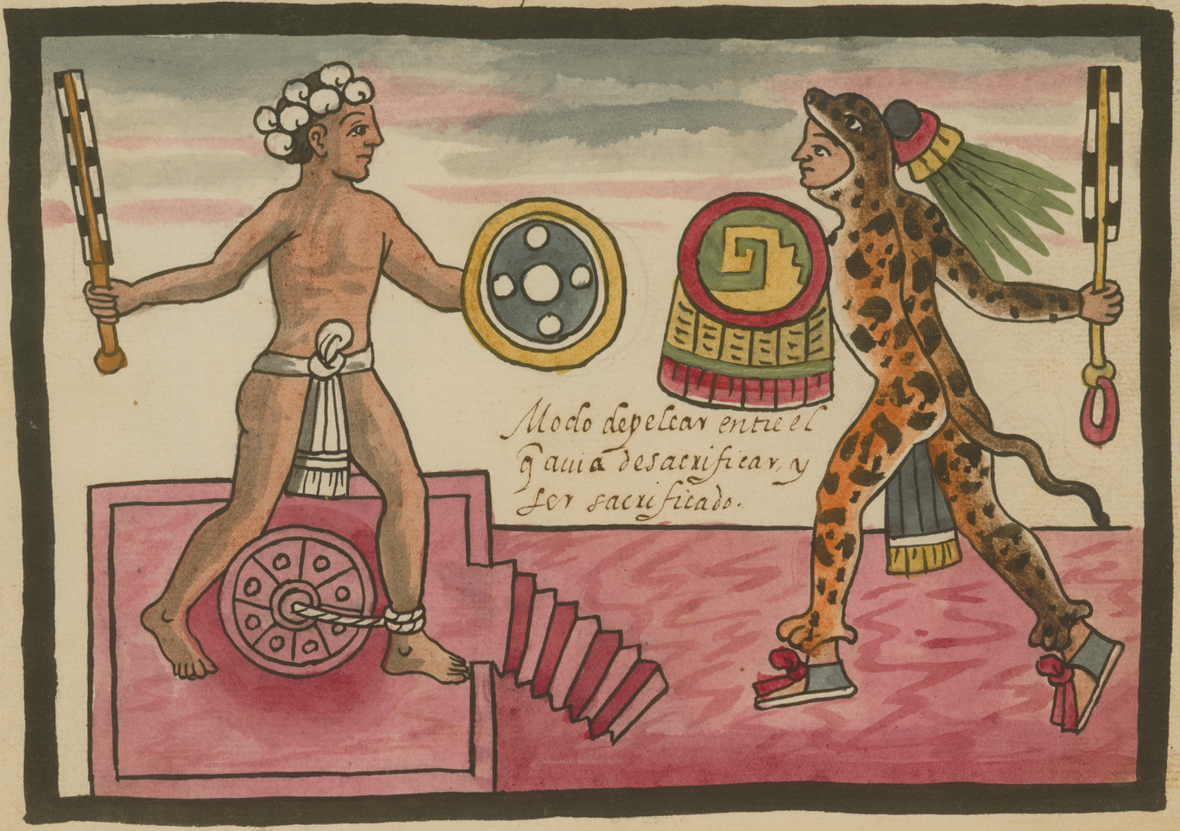
A page from the Codex Tovar depicting a gladiatorial sacrifice honoring the deity Xipe Totec. The rite was celebrated during the festival of Tlacaxipehualiztli (the Feast of the Flaying of Men).

The Mixtec players of the Mesoamerican ballgame were sacrificed when the game was used to resolve a dispute between cities. The rulers would play a game instead of going to battle. The losing ruler would be sacrificed. The ruler "Eight Deer", who was considered a great ball player and who won several cities this way, was eventually sacrificed, because he attempted to go beyond lineage-governing practices, and to create an empire.

Human sacrifice was also practiced by several other Mesoamerican cultures. At Teotihuacan, archaeological evidence indicates that human victims were sacrificed on a large scale, including during major building events at the Pyramid of the Moon. At Tula, an Early Postclassic city associated with the Toltec culture, a bioarchaeological study identified at least 49 individuals, mostly children, whose remains were interpreted as evidence of child sacrifice. The Purépecha or Tarascan people of western Mexico also practiced human sacrifice, with archaeological evidence of large-scale ritual violence at Tzintzuntzan, their Postclassic capital.

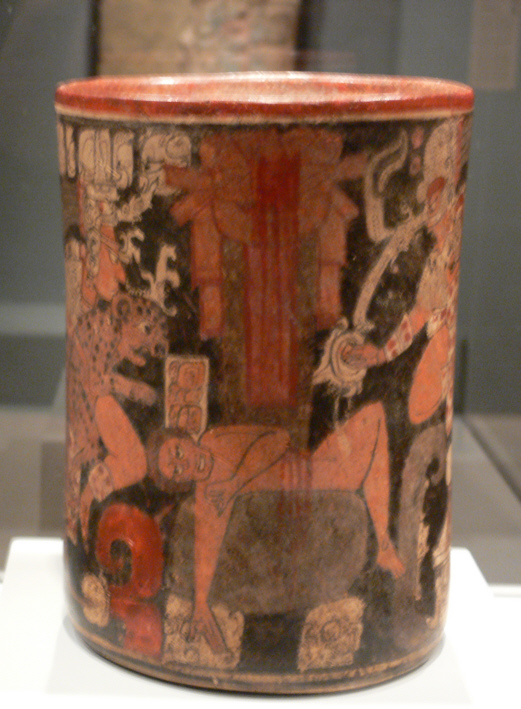
Human sacrificial victim on a Maya vessel, 600–850 CE (Dallas Museum of Art)

===== Maya =====
The Maya held the belief that cenotes or limestone sinkholes were portals to the underworld and sacrificed human beings and tossed them down the cenote to please the water god Chaac. The most notable example of this is the "Sacred Cenote" at Chichén Itzá. Extensive excavations have recovered the remains of 42 individuals, half of them under twenty years old.

Only in the Post-Classic era did this practice become as frequent as in central Mexico. In the Post-Classic period, the victims and the altar are represented as daubed in a hue now known as Maya blue, obtained from the añil plant and the clay mineral palygorskite.

===== Aztecs =====
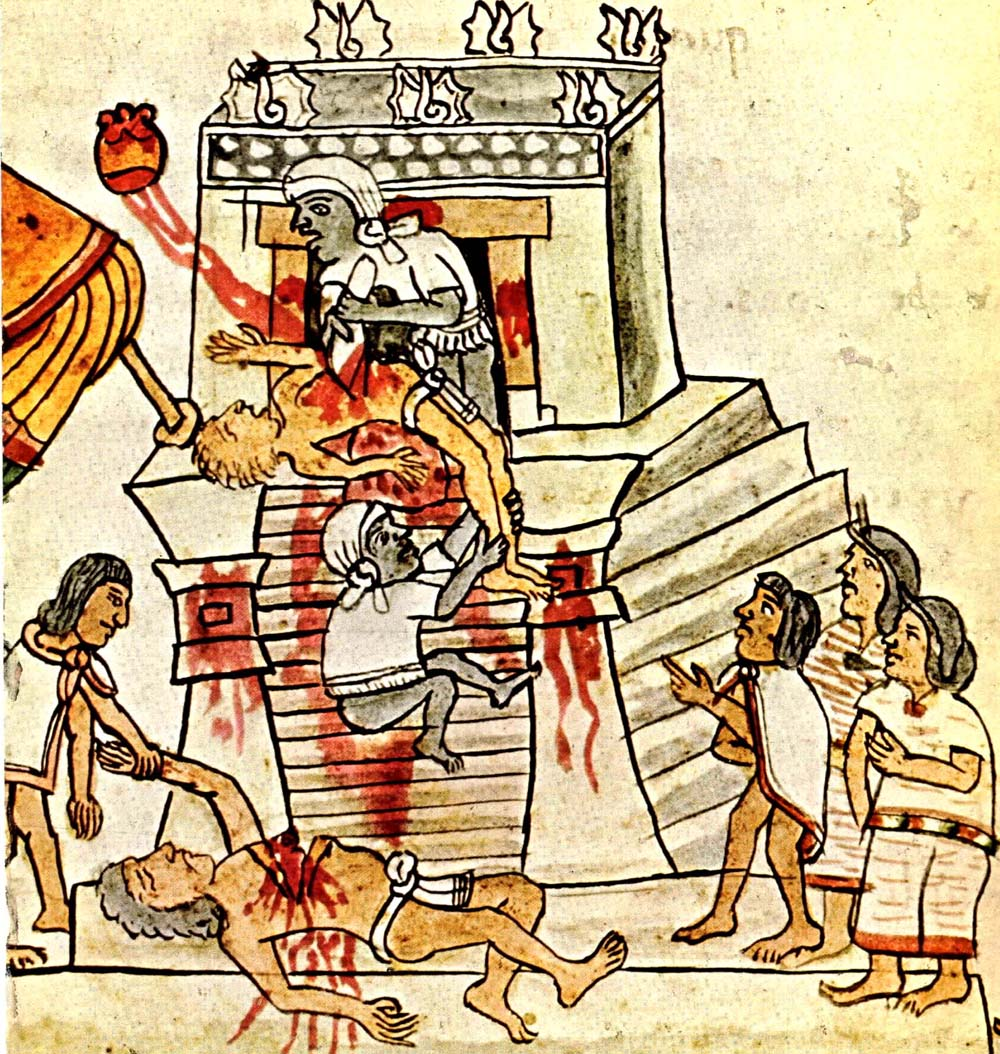
Aztec heart sacrifices, Codex Mendoza

The Aztecs were particularly noted for practicing human sacrifice on a large scale; an offering to Huitzilopochtli would be made to restore the blood he lost, as the sun was engaged in a daily battle. Human sacrifices would prevent the end of the world that could happen on each cycle of 52 years. In the 1487 re-consecration of the Great Pyramid of Tenochtitlan, some have estimated that 80,400 prisoners were sacrificed though numbers are difficult to quantify, as all obtainable Aztec texts were destroyed by Christian missionaries during the period 1528–1548. The Aztec, also known as Mexica, periodically sacrificed children as it was believed that the rain god, Tlāloc, required the tears of children.

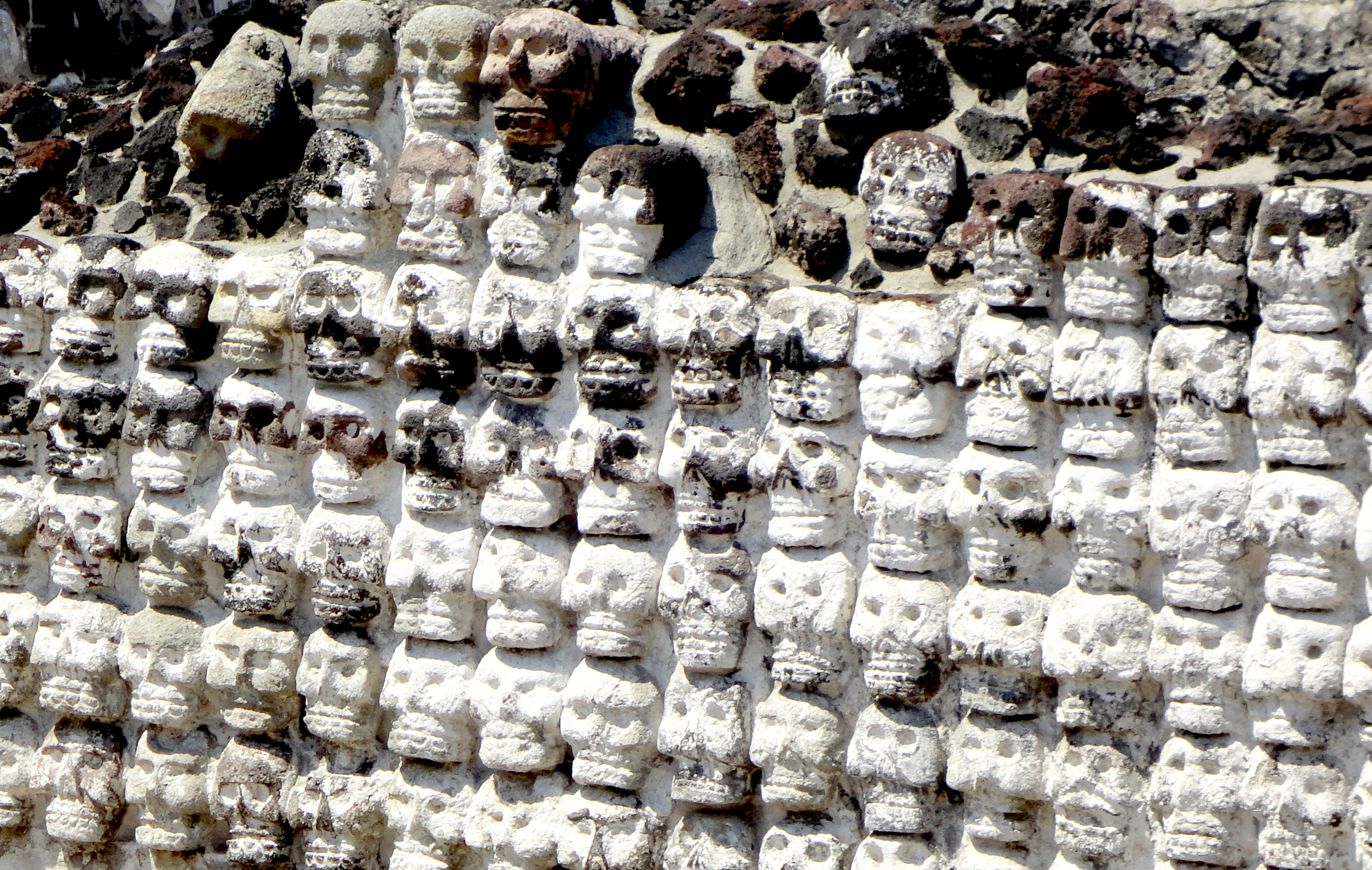
An excavated tzompantli from the Templo Mayor in modern-day Mexico City

According to Ross Hassig, author of Aztec Warfare, "between 10,000 and 80,400 people" were sacrificed in the ceremony. The old reports of numbers sacrificed for special feasts have been described as "unbelievably high" by some authors and that on cautious reckoning, based on reliable evidence, the numbers could not have exceeded at most several hundred per year in Tenochtitlan. The real number of sacrificed victims during the 1487 consecration is unknown.

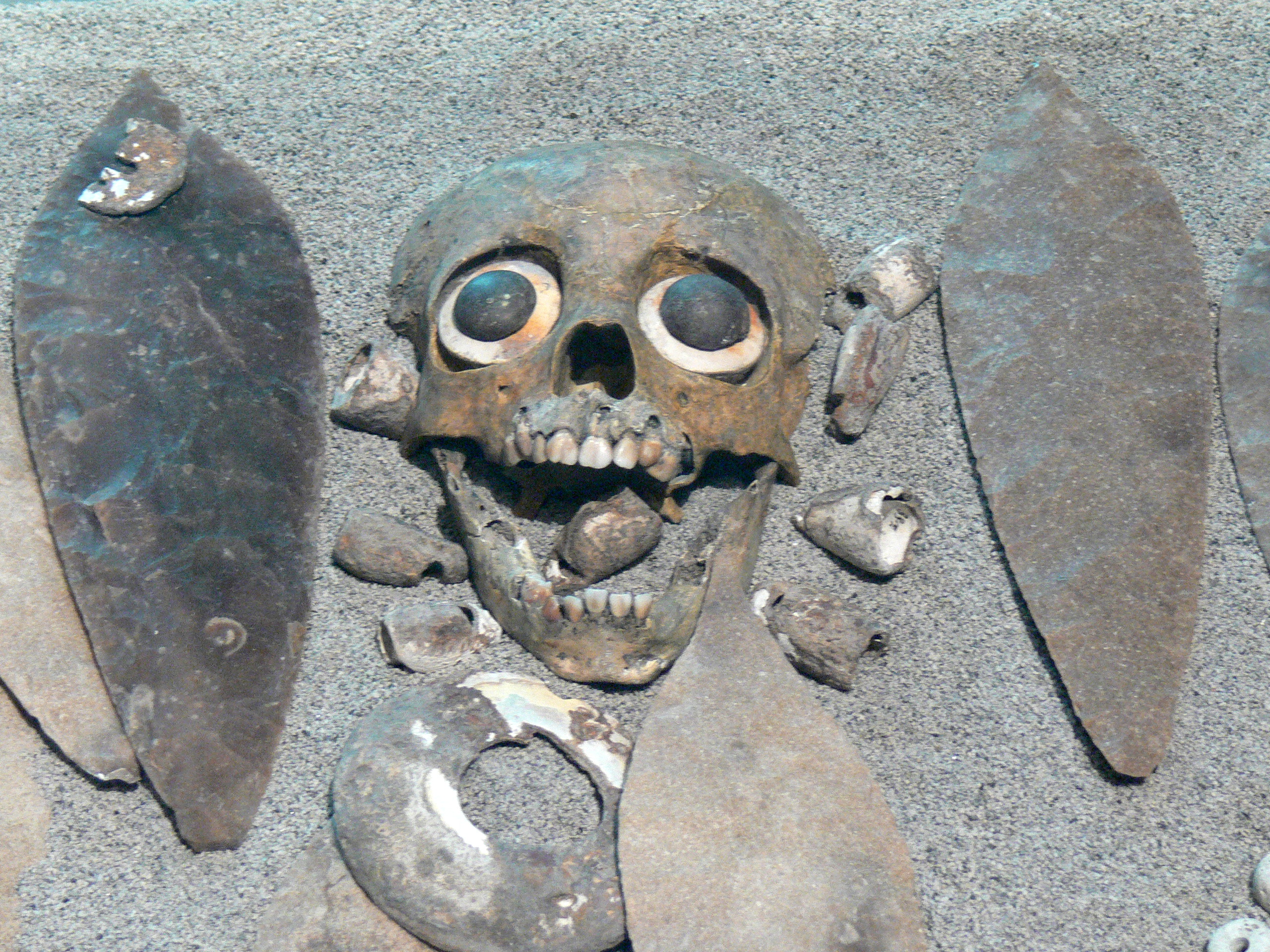
Aztec burial of a sacrificed child at Tlatelolco

Michael Harner, in his 1997 article The Enigma of Aztec Sacrifice, estimates the number of persons sacrificed in central Mexico in the 15th century as high as 250,000 per year. Fernando de Alva Cortés Ixtlilxochitl, a Mexica descendant and the author of Codex Ixtlilxochitl, claimed that one in five children of the Mexica subjects was killed annually. Victor Davis Hanson argues that an estimate by Carlos Zumárraga of 20,000 per annum is more plausible. Other scholars believe that, since the Aztecs always tried to intimidate their enemies, it is far more likely that they inflated the official number as a propaganda tool.

===== Mississippian Cultures =====
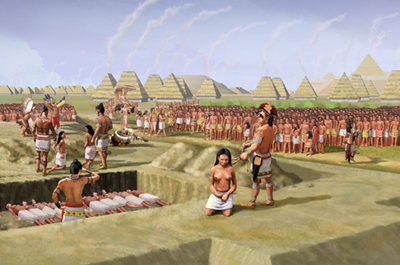
Mound 72 mass sacrifice of 53 young women

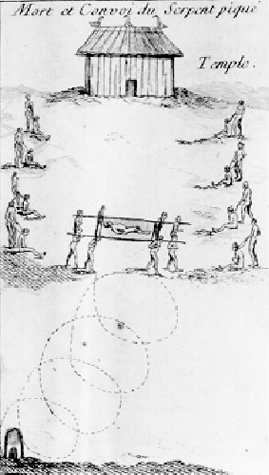
The funeral procession of Tattooed Serpent in 1725, with retainers waiting to be sacrificed

The peoples of what is now the Southeastern United States known as the Mississippian culture (800 to 1600 CE) have been suggested to have practiced human sacrifice, because some artifacts have been interpreted as depicting such acts. Mound 72 at Cahokia (the largest Mississippian site), located near modern St. Louis, Missouri, was found to have numerous pits filled with mass burials thought to have been retainer sacrifices. One of several similar pit burials had the remains of 53 young women who had been strangled and neatly arranged in two layers. Another pit held 39 men, women, and children who showed signs of dying a violent death before being unceremoniously dumped into the pit. Several bodies showed signs of not having been fully dead when buried and of having tried to claw their way to the surface. On top of these people another group had been neatly arranged on litters made of cedar poles and cane matting. Another group of four individuals found in the mound were interred on a low platform, with their arms interlocked. They had had their heads and hands removed. The most spectacular burial at the mound is the "Birdman burial". This was the burial of a tall man in his 40s, now thought to have been an important early Cahokian ruler. He was buried on an elevated platform covered by a bed of more than 20,000 marine-shell disc beads arranged in the shape of a falcon, with the bird's head appearing beneath and beside the man's head, and its wings and tail beneath his arms and legs. Below the birdman was another man, buried facing downward. Surrounding the birdman were several other retainers and groups of elaborate grave goods.

A ritual sacrifice of retainers and commoners upon the death of an elite personage is also attested in the historical record among the last remaining fully Mississippian culture, the Natchez. Upon the death of "Tattooed Serpent" in 1725, the war chief and younger brother of the "Great Sun" or Chief of the Natchez; two of his wives, one of his sisters (nicknamed La Glorieuse by the French), his first warrior, his doctor, his head servant and the servant's wife, his nurse, and a craftsman of war clubs all chose to die and be interred with him, as well as several old women and an infant who was strangled by his parents. Great honor was associated with such a sacrifice, and their kin were held in high esteem. After a funeral procession with the chief's body carried on a litter made of cane matting and cedar poles ended at the temple (which was located on top of a low platform mound), the retainers, with their faces painted red and drugged with large doses of nicotine, were ritually strangled. Tattooed Serpent was then buried in a trench inside the temple floor and the retainers were buried in other locations atop the mound surrounding the temple. After a few months' time the bodies were dis-interred and their defleshed bones were stored as bundle burials in the temple.

===== Pawnee =====
The Pawnee may have occasionally conducted the Morning Star Ceremony, which included the sacrifice of a young girl. Though the ritual continued, the sacrifice was discontinued in the 19th century.

==== South America ====
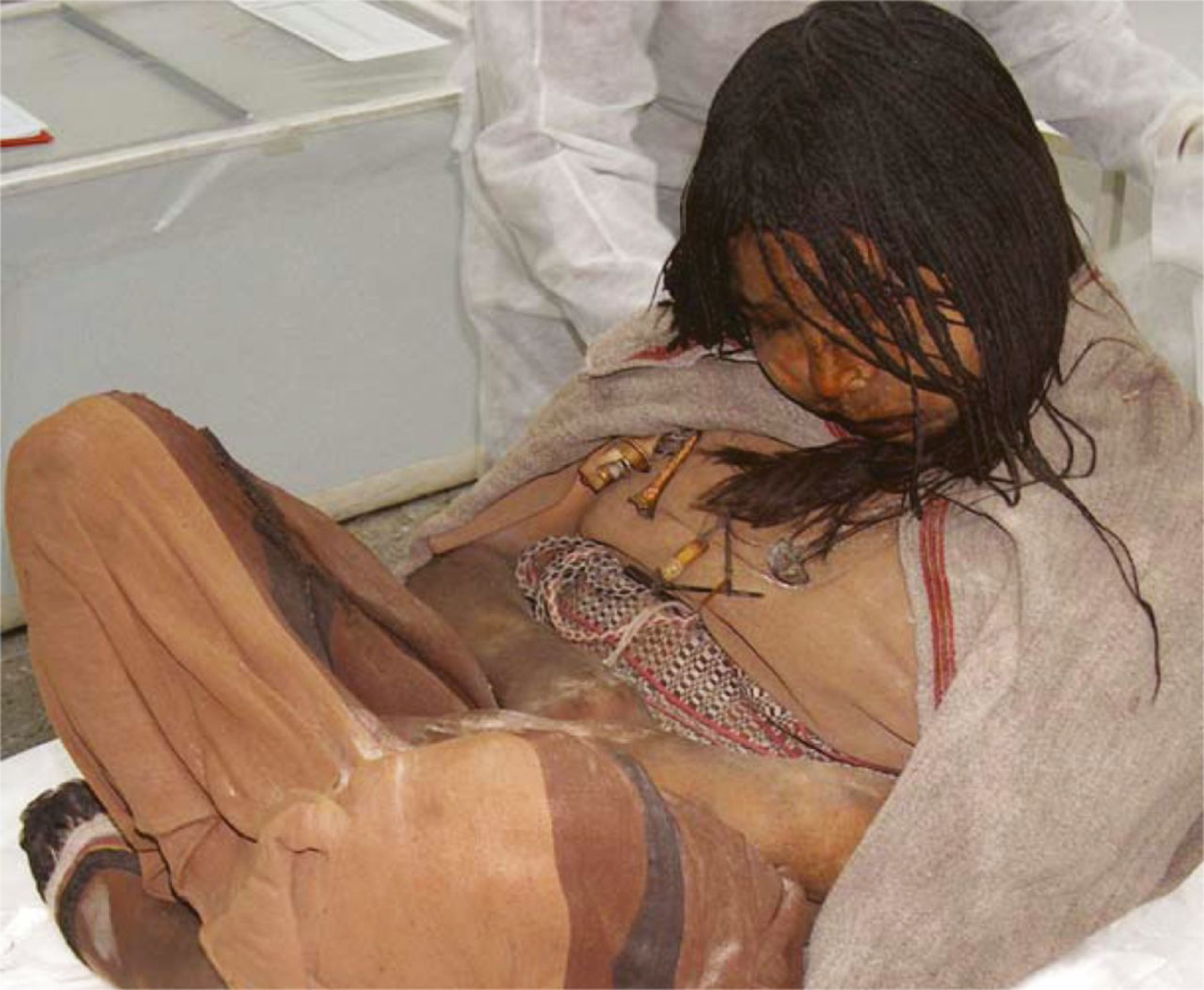
"The Maiden", one of the Llullaillaco mummies, Inca human sacrifice, Salta province (Argentina)

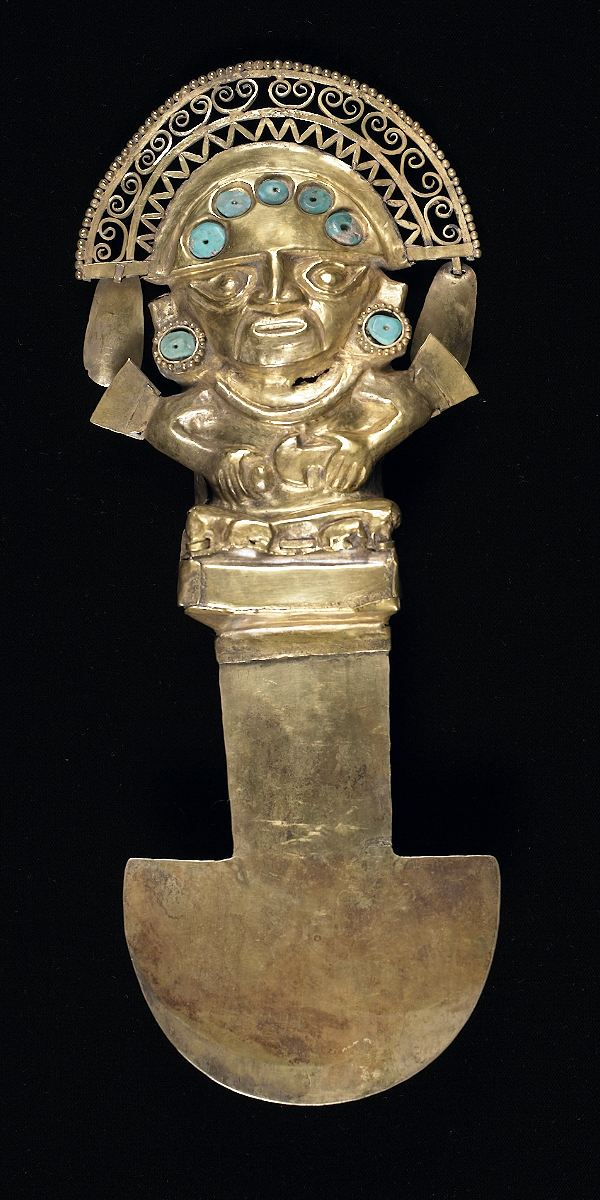
A "Tumi", a ceremonial knife used in Andean cultures, often for sacrificial purposes

The Moche sacrificed teenagers en masse, as archaeologist Steve Bourget found when he uncovered the bones of 42 male adolescents in 1995.

The study of the images seen in Moche art has enabled researchers to reconstruct the culture's most important ceremonial sequence, which began with ritual combat and culminated in the sacrifice of those defeated in battle. Dressed in fine clothes and adornments, armed warriors faced each other in ritual combat. In this hand-to-hand encounter the aim was to remove the opponent's headdress rather than kill him. The object of the combat was the provision of victims for sacrifice. The vanquished were stripped and bound, after which they were led in procession to the place of sacrifice. The captives are portrayed as strong and sexually potent. In the temple, the priests and priestesses would prepare the victims for sacrifice. The sacrificial methods employed varied, but at least one of the victims would be bled to death. His blood was offered to the principal deities in order to please and placate them.

Human sacrifice was also practiced by the Chimú. At Huanchaquito-Las Llamas in northern Peru, archaeologists identified a single mass sacrifice of more than 140 children dating to around AD 1450. Both boys and girls were among the victims. At nearby Pampa La Cruz, archaeologists have identified 227 sacrificed children and evidence of six sacrificial events spanning several centuries.

Moche ceramic vessel from the culture's peak period, depicting the ritual sacrifice of captured enemy warriors thrown from mountain cliffs.

Among the Lambayeque or Muchik peoples, excavations at Cerro Cerrillos uncovered 81 human skeletons interpreted as victims of human sacrifice, providing evidence for a distinct tradition of ritual killing on the northern coast of Peru.

The Nasca of southern Peru practiced ritual decapitation and the taking of human trophy heads. Archaeological evidence indicates that some decapitated individuals were local people and were placed in ritual contexts, although researchers continue to debate whether Nasca trophy heads were primarily taken from sacrificial victims or defeated enemies.

The Incas of Peru also practiced human sacrifice, especially at great festivals or royal funerals where retainers died to accompany the dead into the next life. As many as 4,000 servants, court officials, favorites, and concubines were killed upon the death of the Inca Huayna Capac in 1527, for example. A number of mummies of sacrificed children have been recovered in the Inca regions of South America, an ancient practice known as qhapaq hucha. The Incas performed child sacrifices during or after important events, such as the death of the Sapa Inca (emperor) or during a famine.

=== Africa ===
==== West Africa ====
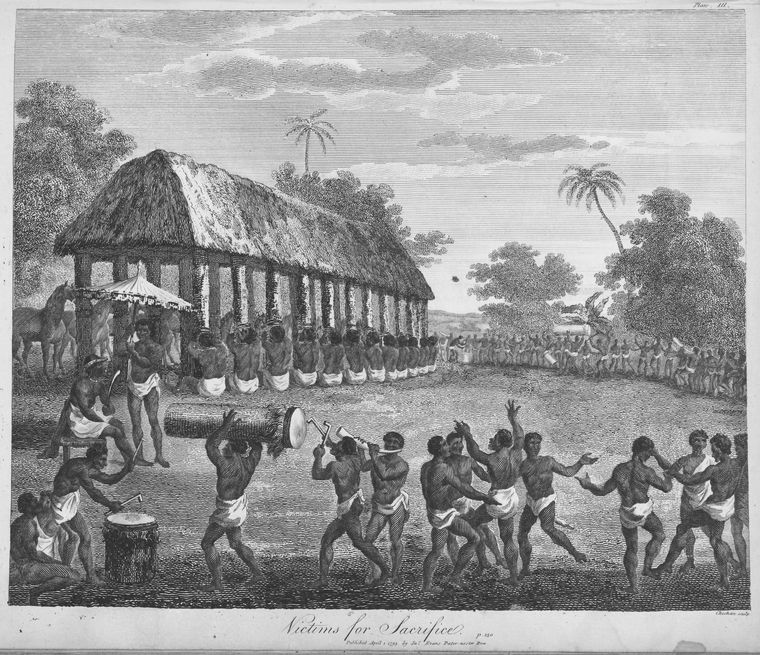
Victims for sacrifice – from The history of Dahomy, an inland Kingdom of Africa, 1793

JuJu Human sacrifice is still covertly practiced in some parts of West Africa, though it is illegal in all West African countries. The Annual customs of Dahomey was the most notorious example, but sacrifices were carried out all along the West African coast and further inland. Sacrifices were particularly common after the death of a king or queen, and there are many recorded cases of hundreds or even thousands of slaves being sacrificed at such events. Sacrifices were particularly common in Dahomey, in what is now Benin, and in the small independent states in what is now southern Nigeria. According to Rudolph Rummel, "Just consider the Grand Custom in Dahomey: When a ruler died, hundreds, sometimes even thousands, of prisoners would be slain. In one of these ceremonies in 1727, as many as 4,000 were reported killed. In addition, Dahomey had an Annual Custom during which 500 prisoners were sacrificed."

In the Ashanti Region of modern-day Ghana, human sacrifice was often combined with capital punishment.

The Leopard men were a West African secret society active into the mid-1900s that practised cannibalism. It was believed that the ritual cannibalism would strengthen both members of the society and their entire tribe. In Tanganyika, the Lion men committed an estimated 200 murders in a single three-month period.

==== Canary Islands ====
It has been reported from Spanish chronicles that the Guanches (ancient inhabitants of these islands) performed both animal and human sacrifices.

During the summer solstice in Tenerife children were sacrificed by being thrown from a cliff into the sea. These children were brought from various parts of the island for the purpose of sacrifice. Likewise, when an aboriginal king died his subjects should also assume the sea, along with the embalmers who embalmed the Guanche mummies.

In Gran Canaria, bones of children were found mixed with those of lambs and goat kids and on Tenerife, amphorae have been found with the remains of children inside. This suggests a different kind of ritual infanticide from those who were thrown off the cliffs.

== Prohibition in major religions ==
=== Greek polytheism ===
In Greek polytheism, Tantalus was said to have been condemned to Tartarus for eternity for the human sacrifice of his son Pelops.

=== Abrahamic religions ===
Many traditions of Abrahamic religions such as Judaism, Christianity and Islam consider that God commanded Abraham to sacrifice his son to examine obedience of Abraham to His commands. To prove his obedience, Abraham intended to sacrifice his son. However, seeing Abraham's resolve, God commanded Abraham to sacrifice a ram instead of his son.

==== Judaism ====
Judaism explicitly forbids human sacrifice, regarding it as murder. Jews view the Akedah as central to the abolition of human sacrifice. Some Talmudic scholars assert that its replacement is the sacrificial offering of animals at the Temple – using Exodus 13:2–12ff; 22:28ff; 34:19ff; Numeri 3:1ff; 18:15; Deuteronomy 15:19 – others view that as being superseded by the symbolic pars-pro-toto sacrifice of the covenant of circumcision. Leviticus 20:2 and Deuteronomy 18:10 specifically outlaw the giving of children to Moloch, making it punishable by stoning; the Tanakh subsequently denounces human sacrifice as barbaric customs of Moloch worshippers (e.g. Psalms 106:37ff).

Judges chapter 11 features a Judge named Jephthah vowing that "whatsoever cometh forth from the doors of my house to meet me shall surely be the Lord's, and I will offer it up as a burnt-offering" in gratitude for God's help with a military battle against the Ammonites. Much to Jephthah's dismay, his only daughter greeted him upon his triumphant return. Judges 11:39 states that Jephthah did as he had vowed, but "shies away from explicitly depicting her sacrifice, which leads some ancient and modern interpreters (e.g., Radak) to suggest that she was not actually killed."

According to the Mishnah he was under no obligation to keep the ill-phrased, illegal vow. According to Rabbi Jochanan, in his commentary on the Mishnah, it was Jephthah's obligation to pay the vow in money. According to some commentators of the rabbinic Jewish tradition during the Middle Ages, Jepthah's daughter was not sacrificed, but was forbidden to marry and remained a spinster her entire life.

The 1st-century CE Jewish-Hellenistic historian Flavius Josephus, however, stated that Jephthah "sacrificed his child as a burnt-offering – a sacrifice neither sanctioned by the law nor well-pleasing to God; for he had not by reflection probed what might befall or in what aspect the deed would appear to them that heard of it". Latin philosopher pseudo-Philo, late 1st century CE, wrote that Jephthah burnt his daughter because he could find no sage in Israel who would cancel his vow. In other words, in the opinion of the Latin philosopher, this story of an ill-phrased vow consolidates that human sacrifice is not an order or requirement by God, but the punishment for those who illegally vowed to sacrifice humans.

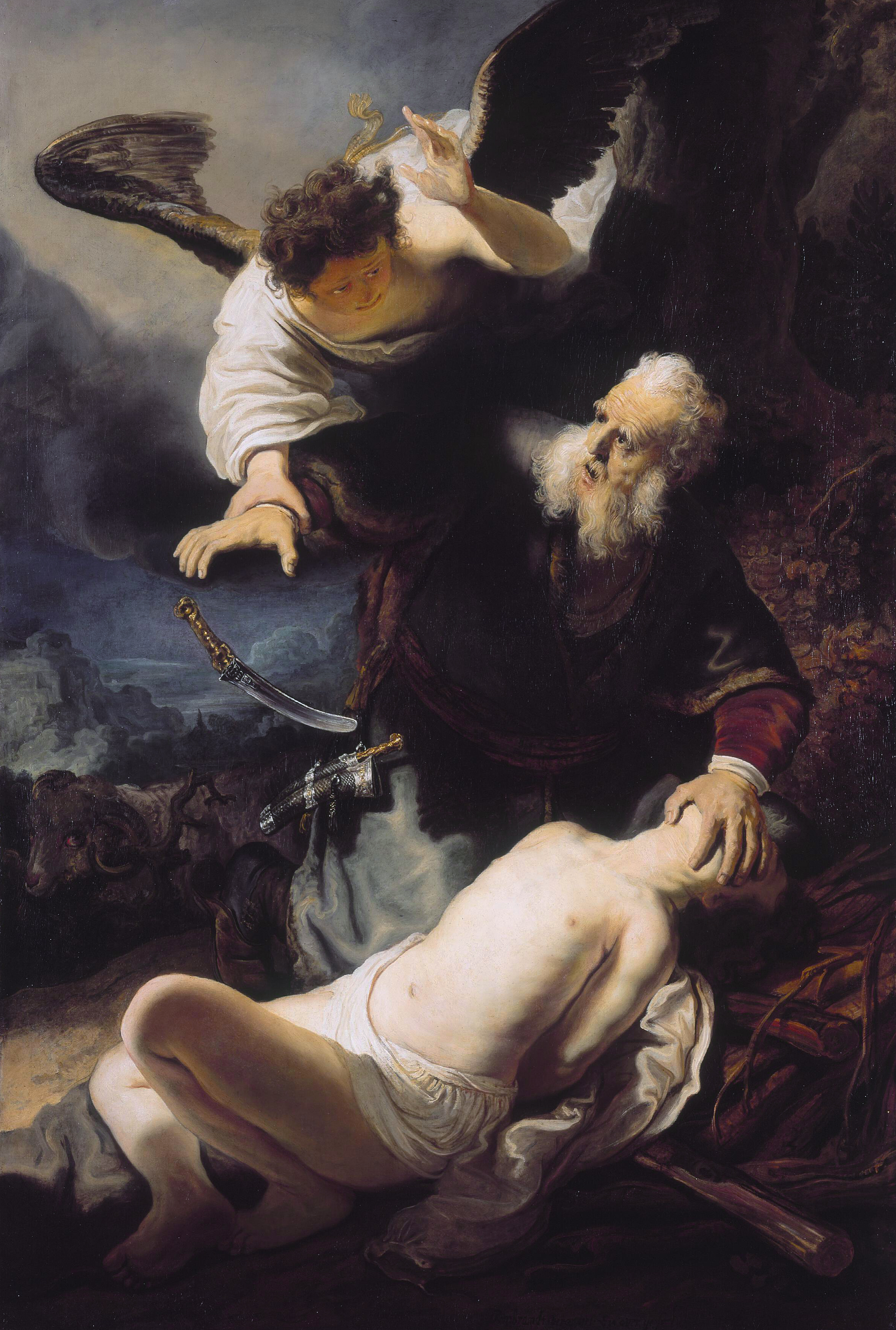
An angel ends the Binding of Isaac by Abraham – believed to be a foreshadowing of the human sacrifice of Christ (The Offering of Abraham, Genesis 22:1–13, workshop of Rembrandt, 1636; Christian art)

Allegations accusing Jews of committing ritual murder – called the "blood libel" – were widespread during the Middle Ages, often leading to the slaughter of entire Jewish communities. In the 20th century, similar accusations of ritual child killing by non-Christians were made as part of the satanic ritual abuse moral panic.

==== Christianity ====
Christianity developed the belief that the story of Isaac's binding was a foreshadowing of the sacrifice of Christ, whose death and resurrection are believed to have enabled the salvation and atonement for man from its sins, including original sin. There is a tradition that the site of Isaac's binding, Moriah, later became Jerusalem, the city of Jesus's future crucifixion. The beliefs of many Christian denominations hinge upon the substitutionary atonement of the sacrifice of God the Son, which was necessary for salvation in the afterlife. According to Christian teaching, each individual person on earth must participate in, and / or receive the benefits of, this divine human sacrifice for the atonement of their sins. Early Christian sources explicitly described this event as a sacrificial offering, with Christ in the role of both priest and human sacrifice, although starting with the Enlightenment, some writers, such as John Locke, have disputed the model of Jesus' death as a propitiatory sacrifice.

Although early Christians in the Roman Empire were accused of being cannibals, theophages (Greek for "god eaters") practices such as human sacrifice were abhorrent to them. Eastern Orthodox and Roman Catholic Christians believe that this "pure sacrifice" as Christ's self-giving in love is made present in the sacrament of the Eucharist. In this tradition, bread and wine becomes the "real presence" (the literal carnal Body and Blood of the Risen Christ). Receiving the Eucharist is a central part of the religious life of Catholic and Orthodox Christians. Most Protestant traditions do not share the belief in the real presence but otherwise are varied, for example, they may believe that in the bread and wine, Christ is present only spiritually, not in the sense of a change in substance (Methodism) or that the bread and wine of communion are a merely symbolic reminder (Baptist).

In medieval Irish Catholic texts, there is mention of the early church in Ireland supposedly containing the practice of burying sacrificial victims underneath churches in order to consecrate them. This may have a relation to pagan Celtic practices of foundation sacrifice. The most notable example of this is the case of Odran of Iona a companion of St Columba who (according to legend) volunteered to die and be buried under the church of the monastery of Iona. However, there is no evidence that such things ever happened in reality and contemporary records closer to the time period have no mention of a practice like this.

==== Islam ====
Islam considers sacrifice of human children to be repugnant to the faith. It is also described in the Quran as a common practice in pre-Islamic civilization, from Greece to Arabia. The binding of Prophet Ismaeel story is interpreted as Allah showing the superiority of animal sacrifices over human sacrifices.

=== Indian religions ===
Many Indian religions, including Buddhism, Jainism and some sects of Hinduism, embrace the teaching of ahimsa (non-violence) which imposes vegetarianism and outlaws animal as well as human sacrifice.

==== Buddhism ====
In the case of Buddhism, both bhikkhus (monks) and bhikkhunis (nuns) were forbidden to take life in any form as part of the monastic code, while non-violence was promoted among laity through encouragement of the Five Precepts. Across the Buddhist world both meat and alcohol are strongly discouraged as offerings to a Buddhist altar, with the former being synonymous with sacrifice, and the latter a violation of the Five Precepts.

In their effort to discredit Tibetan Buddhism, the People's Republic of China as well as Chinese nationalists in the Republic of China make frequent and emphatic references to the historical practice of human sacrifice in Tibet, portraying the 1950 People's Liberation Army invasion of Tibet as an act of humanitarian intervention. According to Chinese sources, in the year 1948, 21 individuals were murdered by state sacrificial priests from Lhasa as part of a ritual of enemy destruction, because their organs were required as magical ingredients. The Tibetan Revolutions Museum established by the Chinese in Lhasa has numerous morbid ritual objects on display to illustrate these claims.

==== Hinduism ====
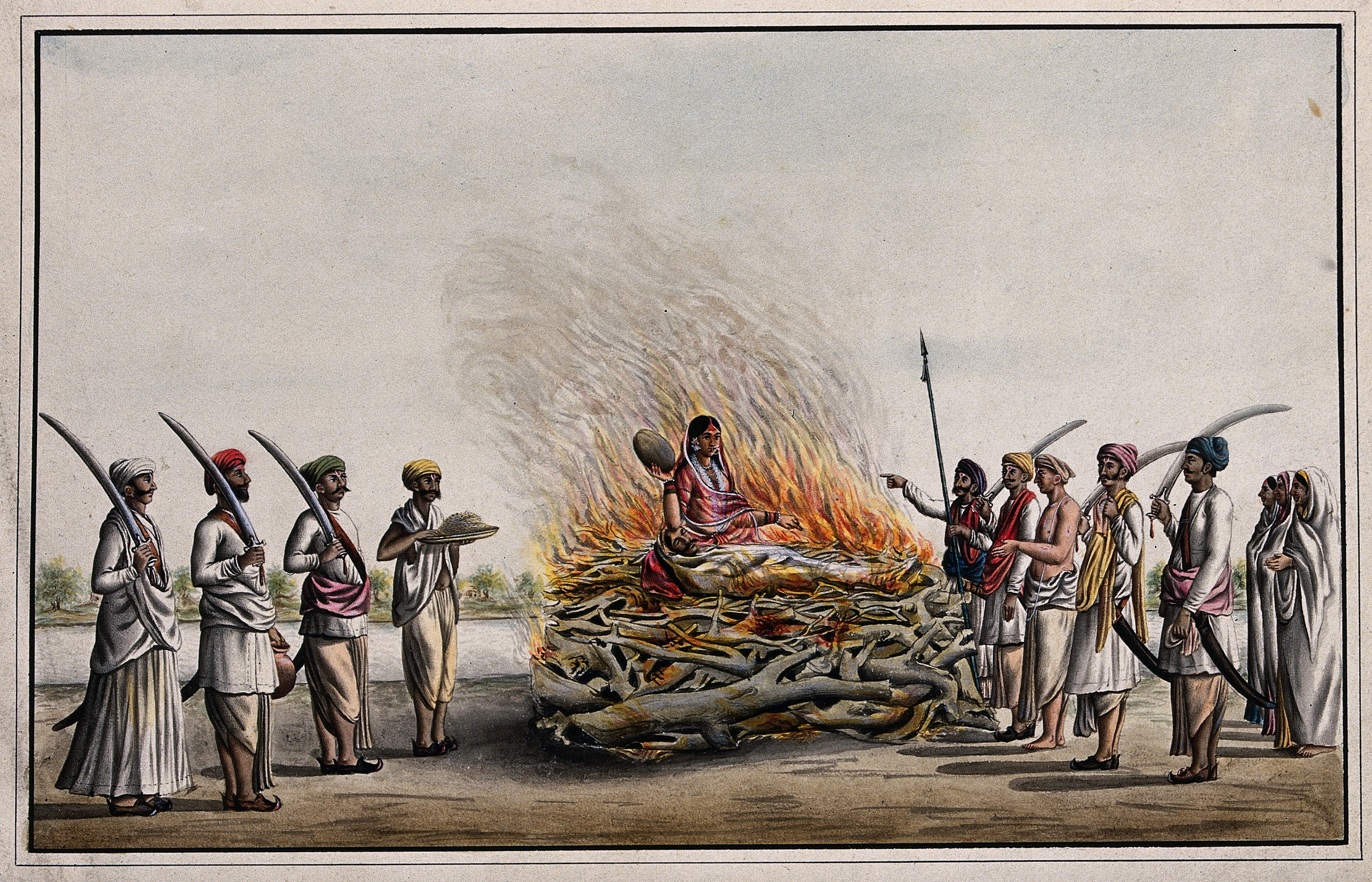
A 19th-century painting depicting an act of sati

In many sects of Hinduism, based on the principle of ahimsa, any human or animal sacrifice is forbidden. In the 19th and 20th centuries, prominent figures of Indian spirituality such as Swami Vivekananda, Ramana Maharshi, Swami Sivananda, and A.C. Bhaktivedanta Swami. have emphasized the importance of ahimsa.

== Modern cases ==
=== The Americas ===
==== Brazil ====
In the city of Altamira, State of Pará, several children were raped, with their genitalia mutilated for what appear to be ritual purposes, and then stabbed to death, between 1989 and 1993. It is believed that the boys' sexual organs were used in rites of black magic.

==== Chile ====
In the coastal village Collileufu, native Lafkenches carried out a ritual human sacrifice in the days following the 1960 Valdivia earthquake. Collileufu, located in the Budi Lake area, south of Puerto Saavedra, was highly isolated in 1960. The Mapuche spoke primarily Mapudungun. The community had gathered in Cerro La Mesa, while the lowlands were struck by successive tsunamis. Juana Namuncura Añen, a local machi, demanded the sacrifice of the grandson of Juan Painecur, a neighbor, in order to calm the earth and the ocean. The victim was 5 year-old José Luis Painecur, called an "orphan" (huacho) because his mother had gone to Santiago, for employment as a domestic worker, and left her son under the care of her father.

José Luis Painecur had his arms and legs removed by Juan Pañán and Juan José Painecur (the victim's grandfather), and was stuck into the sand of the beach like a stake. The waters of the Pacific Ocean then carried the body out to sea. The authorities only learned about the sacrifice after a boy in the commune of Nueva Imperial denounced to local leaders the theft of two horses; these were allegedly eaten during the sacrifice ritual. The two men were charged with the crime and confessed, but later recanted. They were released after two years. A judge ruled that those involved in these events had "acted without free will, driven by an irresistible natural force of ancestral tradition." The story was mentioned in a Time magazine article, although with meagre detail.

==== Mexico ====
During the 1980s, a case of serial murders that involved human sacrifices rituals occurred in Tamaulipas, Mexico. The drug dealer and cult leader Adolfo Constanzo orchestrated several executions during rituals that included the victims' dismemberment.

Between 2009 and 2010, in Sonora, Mexico, a serial killer named Silvia Meraz committed three murders in sacrifice rituals. With the help of her family, she beheaded two boys (both relatives) and one woman in front of an altar dedicated to Santa Muerte.

==== Panama ====
The syncretistic "New Light Of God" sect in the town of El Terrón, Ngäbe-Buglé Comarca, Panama, believed they had a mandate from God to sacrifice members of their community who failed to repent to their satisfaction. In 2020, 5 children, their pregnant mother, and a neighbor were killed and decapitated at the sect's church building, with 14 other wounded victims being rescued. Victims were hacked with machetes, beaten with Bibles and cudgels, and burned with embers. A goat was ritually sacrificed at the scene as well. The cult's beliefs were a syncretic blend of Pentecostalism with indigenous beliefs and some New Age ideas including emphasis on the third eye. A leader of the Ngäbe-Buglé region labeled the sect "satanic" and demanded its eradication.

=== Asia ===
==== Bangladesh ====
In March 2010, a 26-year-old labourer in Bangladesh was killed by fellow workers on the orders of the owners after a fortune teller suggested that a human sacrifice would yield highly prized "red bricks".

==== India ====
Several incidents of human sacrifice have been reported in India since independence. In 1996, a nine-year-old boy was sacrificed by Jharkhand-native Sushil Murmu as an offering to goddess Kali. Murmu was sentenced to death by the court but later got commuted to life imprisonment by the president of India. According to the Hindustan Times, there was an incident of human sacrifice in western Uttar Pradesh in 2003. (Note: "After a rash of similar killings in the area – according to an unofficial tally in the English language-language Hindustan Times, there have been 25 human sacrifices in western Uttar Pradesh in the last 6 months alone – police have cracked down against tantriks, jailing four and forcing scores of others to close their businesses and pull their ads from newspapers and television stations. The killings and the stern official response have focused renewed attention on tantrism, an amalgam of mysticism practices that grew out of Hinduism.) Police in Khurja reported "dozens of sacrifices" in the period of half a year in 2006, by followers of Kali, the goddess of death and time. In 2010, a two-year-old boy was murdered in Chhattisgarh in a Tantric human sacrifice.

According to the National Crime Records Bureau, more than 100 cases of human sacrifices have been reported in India between 2014 and 2021. In 2015, during the Granite scam investigations of Tamil Nadu, there were reports of possible human sacrifices in the Madurai area to pacify goddess Shakthi for getting power to develop the illegal granite business. Bones and skulls were retrieved from the alleged sites in presence of the special judicial officer appointed by the high court of Madras.

Between June and October 2022, two women were killed and reportedly cannibalised as part of a human sacrifice in Elanthoor in Pathanamthitta district of Kerala. In October 2022, a six-year-old boy was killed in Delhi by two men to please a deity. In 2023, five men were arrested for the killing and decapitation of a woman with a machete in 2019, as part of a religious rite to mark the anniversary of the ringleader's brother's death, after visiting a Hindu temple in Guwahati.

=== Africa ===
Human sacrifice is no longer legal in any country, and such cases are prosecuted. As of 2020 however, there is still black market demand for child abduction in countries such as Kenya for purposes which include human sacrifice.

The last person to be executed by Eswatini, a businesswoman named Philippa Mdluli, was convicted of the March 1980 ritual murder of a 5-year-old girl whose body parts she used to make potions in an attempt to enhance her career.

In January 2008, Milton Blahyi of Liberia stated that he had been part of human sacrifices which "included the killing of an innocent child and plucking out the heart, which was divided into pieces for us to eat." He fought against Charles Taylor's militia.

In 2019, an Anti-balaka leader in Satema in Central African Republic killed a 14-year-old girl in ritualistic way to increase profit from mines.

On 22 March 2014, a group of motorcycle taxi drivers discovered the Ibadan forest of horror, a dilapidated building believed to have been used for human trafficking and ritual sacrifice located in Soka forest in Ibadan, Oyo State, Nigeria.

== Ritual murder ==
Ritual killings perpetrated by individuals or small groups within a society that denounces them as simple murder are difficult to classify as either "human sacrifice" or mere pathological homicide because they lack the societal integration of sacrifice proper.

The Satanic groups Order of Nine Angles and the Temple of the Black Light promote human sacrifice. During the Satanic Panic some conspiracy theorists falsely claimed there were more than a million human sacrifices in the United States.

== Non-lethal "sacrifice" ==
In India, Seega Maramma is a festival where a person is chosen as a "sacrifice", and is believed by participants to die during the ritual, although they actually remain alive and are "raised" from the dead at the end after a period of lying still. Thus, this does not have the same legal implications as a true human sacrifice although participants consider it to be one.

== See also ==
- Acéphale
- Animal sacrifice
- Blood atonement
- Capital punishment
- Child sacrifice
- Curse of Tippecanoe
- Gehenna
- Homo Necans
- Honor killing
- Honor suicide
- Immurement
- Junshi
- Margaret Murray – The Divine King in England
- Maryland ritual killings
- Order of Nine Angles
- Pharmakos
- The Golden Bough
- Purushamedha
- Self-flagellation

== Sources ==
Books

- Carrasco, David (2000). City of Sacrifice: The Aztec Empire and the Role of Violence in Civilization. Moughton Mifflin. ISBN 0-8070-4643-4.
- Clendinnen, Inga (1995). Aztecs: An Interpretation. Cambridge University Press. ISBN 978-0-521-48585-2.
- Coggins, Clemency; Shane, Orrin C. III (1984). Cenote of Sacrifices. The university of Texas Press. ISBN 0-292-71097-6.
- Girard, René (1979). Violence and the Sacred. Translated by Gregory, P. Johns Hopkins University Press. ISBN 0-8264-7718-6.
- Girard, René (2001). I See Satan Fall Like Lightning. Translated by Williams, James G. Orbis Books. ISBN 1-57075-319-9.
- Aldhouse-Green, Miranda (2001). Dying for the Gods. Trafalgar Square. ISBN 0-7524-1940-4.
- Hughes, Dennis D. (1991). Human Sacrifice in Ancient Greece. Routledge. ISBN 0-415-03483-3.
- Hughes, Derek (2007). Culture and Sacrifice: Ritual death in literature and opera. Cambridge University Press. ISBN 978-0-521-86733-7.
- Hutton, Ronald (1991). The Pagan Religions of the Ancient British Isles: Their Nature and Legacy. Wiley. ISBN 0-631-18946-7.
- Kahaner, Larry (1994). Cults That Kill. Warner Books. ISBN 978-0-446-35637-4.
- Valeri, Valerio (1985). Kingship and Sacrifice: Ritual and Society in Ancient Hawaii. University of Chicago Press. ISBN 0-226-84559-1.
- Jensen, Adolf E. (1963). Myth and Cult among Primitive Peoples. University of Chicago Press.

Journal articles

- Winkelman, Michael (Summer 1998). "Aztec human sacrifice: Cross-cultural assessments of the ecological hypothesis". Ethnology. 37 (3): 285–298. doi:10.2307/3774017. JSTOR 3774017.
- Sales, R.H. (April 1957). "Human sacrifice in Biblical thought". Journal of Bible and Religion. 25 (2): 112–117.
- Smith, Brian K.; Doniger, Wendy (December 1989). "Sacrifice and substitution: Ritual mystification and mythical demystification". Numen. 36 (2): 189–224. doi:10.1163/156852789X00045.
- Smith, Brian K. (2000). "Capital punishment and human sacrifice". Journal of the American Academy of Religion. 68 (1): 3–26. doi:10.1093/jaarel/68.1.3.
- Law, Robin (January 1985). "Human sacrifice in pre-Colonial west Africa". African Affairs. 84 (334): 53–87. doi:10.1093/oxfordjournals.afraf.a097676.
- van Baaren, Th. P. (January 1964). "Theoretical Speculations on Sacrifice". Numen. 11: 1.
- Heinsohn, Gunnar (1992). "The rise of blood sacrifice and priest kingship in Mesopotamia: A cosmic decree?". Religion. 22 (2): 109–134. doi:10.1016/0048-721X(92)90054-8. "The rise of blood sacrifice and priest kingship in Mesopotamia: A cosmic decree". Archived from the original on 5 June 2009.
- Rives, J. (1995). "Human Sacrifice among Pagans and Christians". The Journal of Roman Studies. 85: 65–85. doi:10.1017/S0075435800074761.
- Williams, Clifford (1988). "Asante: Human sacrifice or capital punishment? An assessment of the period 1807–1874". The International Journal of African Historical Studies. 21 (3): 433–441. doi:10.2307/219449. JSTOR 219449. – Asante is also called the Ashanti Empire.
- Sheehan, Jonathan (2006). "The Altars of the Idols: Religion, Sacrifice, and the Early Modern Polity". Journal of the History of Ideas. 67 (4): 649–674. doi:10.1353/jhi.2006.0040. S2CID 159538645.
  Sheehan, Jonathan (2006). "The Altars of the Idols: Religion, Sacrifice, and the Early Modern Polity". Journal of the History of Ideas. 67 (4): 649–674. doi:10.1353/jhi.2006.0040. S2CID 159538645.
- Willems, Harco (1990). "Crime, cult, and capital punishment (Mo'alla Inscription 8)". The Journal of Egyptian Archaeology. 76: 27–54.
