= Johan Lund =

Johan Lund may refer to:

- Johan Ludwig Lund (1777–1867), Danish painter
- Johan Michael Lund (1786–1805), Prime Minister of the Faroe Islands

== See also ==
- Johann Lund (1638–1686), Danish pastor
