= Ibadan forest of horror =

Murder location in Nigeria

The Ibadan forest of horror, also known as the Ibadan house of horror or Soka, was a dilapidated building believed to have been used for human trafficking and ritual sacrifice located in Soka forest in Ibadan, Oyo State, Nigeria. The building was discovered on March 22, 2014, by a group of motorcycle taxi drivers, who had formed an impromptu search party after the disappearance of a driver in the area.

Eight survivors were rescued from the building, while numerous body parts, decomposing bodies and personal effects of victims were found in the surrounding area. The activities that occurred in the forest are believed to have been coordinated by unknown kidnappers and ritualists in the state who are often supported by some affluent Nigerians and politicians who use human flesh for rituals. Less than two weeks after the site in Soka was found, a similar site was found in Adigbe in Abeokuta, Ogun State.

The buildings on the site have since been demolished and it has been redeveloped into Oyo State Comprehensive Model School, a secondary school.

== Reactions ==
The discovery of the forest of horror generated controversy throughout Nigeria. There was a concern on the link between the management (kidnappers and ritualist) of the horror forest and some top government officials and notable politicians in the state but there seems to be no clear evidence to establish that fact. There was a claim by the youth in the area that the Oyo State Police command refused to investigate the forest despite several kidnapping cases reported in the state. Some of the survivors rescued from the den claimed that the ritualist kidnapped victims by claiming to be the officials of the urban renewal initiative coordinated by the Oyo State government.
