= Logos-Sarx-Christology =

Logos-Sarx-Christology means Word-Flesh-Christology. It is used to explain the incarnation (becoming human) of the Son of God (the Word). This means that Jesus Christ became a human. Apollinaris of Laodicaea insisted on this doctrine. This doctrine derives the concept from John 1:14 “The Word became flesh” (ho logos sarx egeneto, ὁ λόγος σὰρξ ἐγένετο). It is especially significant that the chief schema of the Athanasian interpretation of Christ recurs, the schema which has become the basic expression of the whole Logos-sarx christology of all types: The Word (Logos) became human (σὰρξ) and did not come into a human body (σῶμα). Cyril had the two frameworks which were to give a first, unconsidered explanation of the relationship between God and human in Christ, the frameworks of ‘indwelling’ and ‘appropriation.’ The Word is ‘in’ the body and the body is ‘appropriated’ by the Word. Karl Barth also insisted on this doctrine.

== See also ==
- Jesus, King of the Jews
- Incarnation
