= Johann Lund =

Danish pastor (1638–1686)

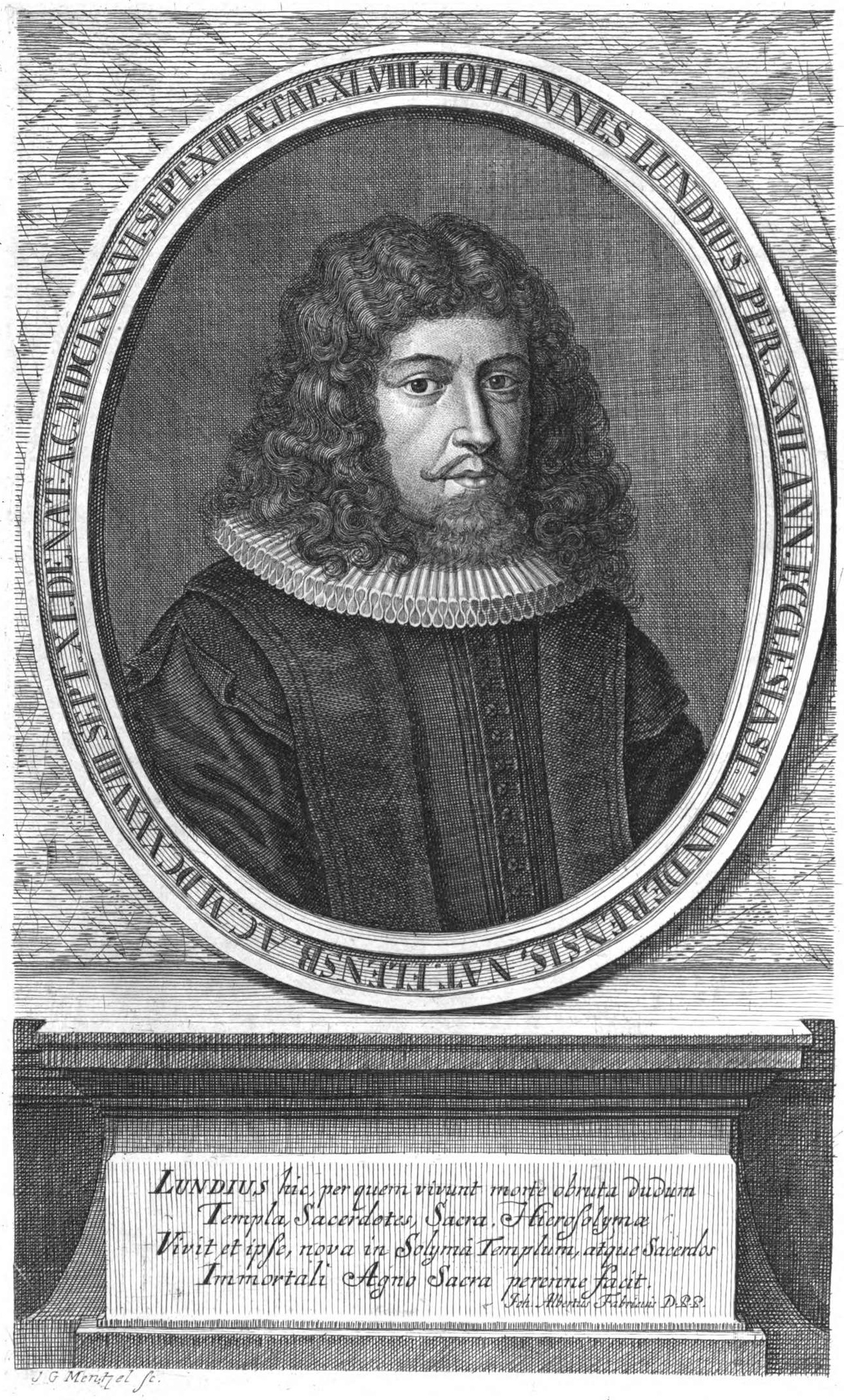
- Portrait of Lund from 1738 by German engraver Johann Georg Mentzel
- Born: 11 September 1638; Flensburg, Duchy of Schleswig, Denmark
- Died: 13 September 1686 (aged 48); Tønder, Denmark

Johann Lund (11 September 1638 – 13 September 1686), also known as Johannes Lundius, was a Lutheran pastor and Hebraist. Lund was born in Flensburg on 11 September 1638 to Thomas Lundius, a deacon at St. John's Church. He died on 13 September 1686 in the town of Tønder, Denmark. His works on ancient Israelite religion were published posthumously by his son Thomas Lund.

== Published works ==
- Thomas Lund (ed.) Oeffentlicher Gottesdienst der alten Hebräer, Schleswig 1695
- Thomas Lund (ed.) Levitischer Hohepriester und Priester, Schleswig 1695
- Thomas Lund (ed.) Ausführliche Beschreibung der Hütte des Stifts, wie auch des ersten und andern Tempels zu Jerusalem, Schleswig 1696
- Heinrich Muhlius (ed.), Die alten jüdischen Heiligthümer, Gottesdienste und Gewohnheiten, Hamburg 1711; transl. J. le Long, Heiligdommen, godsdiensten, en gewoontens der oude Jooden, Amsterdam 1723.
