= The Ashram =

The Ashram may refer to:

- The Ashram (novel), a 2005 novel by Sattar Memon
- The Ashram (film), a 2018 fantasy thriller film

== See also ==
- Ashram (disambiguation)
