= Sati (practice) =

Historical Hindu practice of widow immolation

Aquatint from the early 19th century purporting to show ritual preparation for the immolation of a Hindu widow—shown in a white sari near the water—on the funeral pyre of her deceased husband.

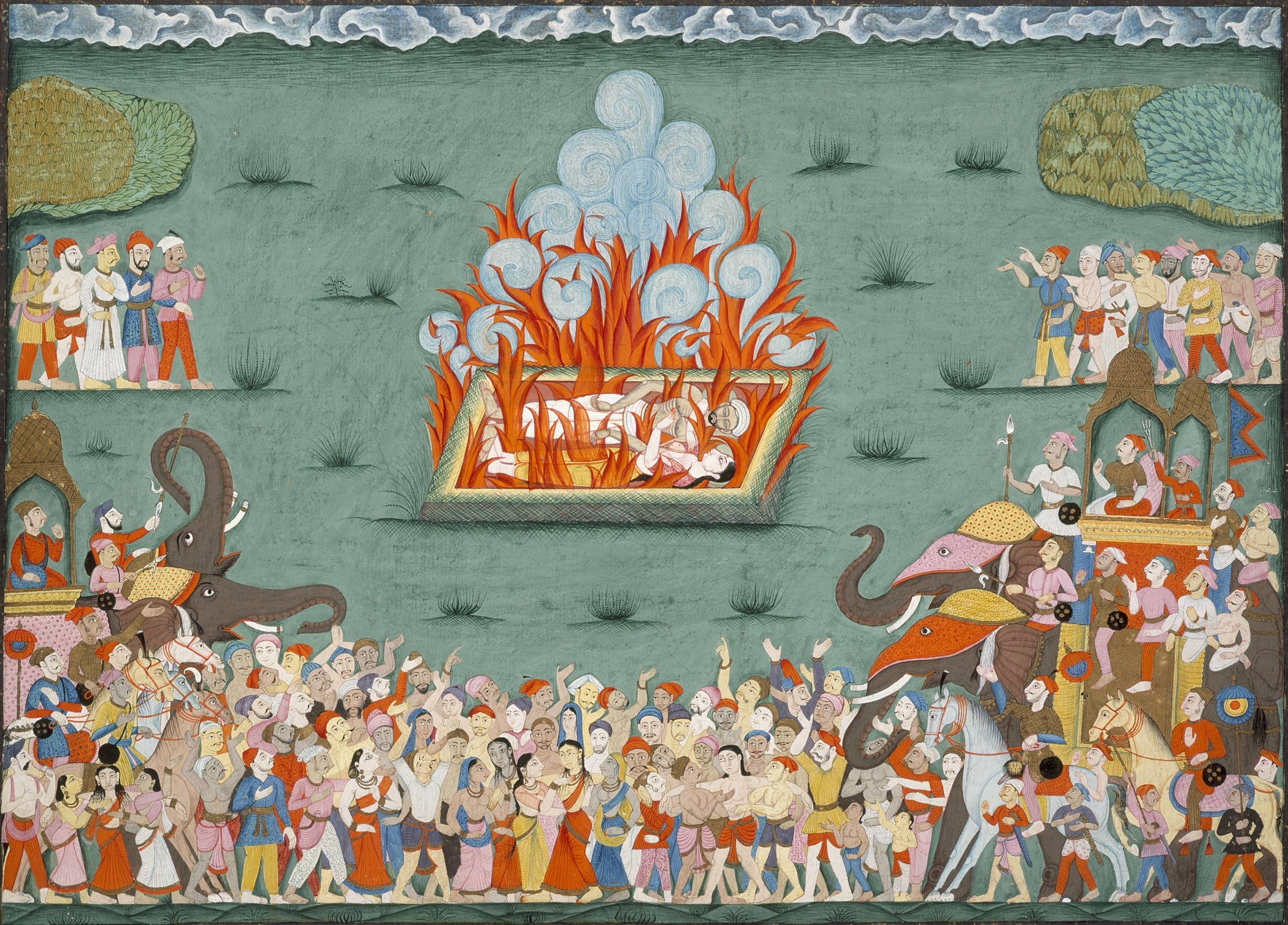
The Sati of Ramabai, wife of Peshwa Madhavrao I in 1772

Sati or suttee (Note: The spelling suttee is a phonetic spelling using 19th-century English orthography. The satī transliteration uses the more modern ISO/IAST (International Alphabet of Sanskrit Transliteration), the academic standard for writing the Sanskrit language with the Latin alphabet system.) is a chiefly historical Hindu practice in which a widow burns alive on her deceased husband's funeral pyre, either voluntarily, by coercion, or by a perception of the lack of satisfactory options for continuing to live. Although it is debated whether it received scriptural mention in early Hinduism, it has been linked to related Hindu practices in the Indo-Aryan-speaking regions of India, which have diminished the rights of women, especially those to the inheritance of property. (Note: "Thus the Laws of Manu severely reduced the property rights of women, recommended a significant difference in ages between husband and wife and the relatively early marriage of women, and banned widow remarriage. Manu's preoccupation with chastity reflected possibly a growing concern for the maintenance of inheritance rights in the male line, a fear of women undermining the increasingly rigid caste divisions, and a growing emphasis on male asceticism as a higher spiritual calling.") (Note: "Therefore, by the time of the Mauryan Empire the position of women in mainstream Indo-Aryan society seems to have deteriorated. Customs such as child marriage and dowry were becoming entrenched; and a young women's purpose in life was to provide sons for the male lineage into which she married. ... It is important to note that, in all likelihood, these developments did not affect people living in large parts of the subcontinent—such as those in the south, and tribal communities inhabiting the forested hill and plateau areas of Southern Asia where Hinduism was practised. That said, these deleterious features have continued to blight Indo-Aryan-speaking areas of the subcontinent until the present day.) A cold form of sati, or the neglect and casting out of Hindu widows, has been prevalent from ancient times.

Greek sources from around c. 300 BCE make isolated mention of sati, and Hindu inscriptions from 464 CE onward, common by the 11th century, record the practice of a real fire sacrifice. The first references to sati in Brahmin law-books appeared in the 7th century. It was widely recognised, but not universally accepted, by the 12th century. Records of sati exist throughout many time periods and regions. There were significant differences in different regions and among communities; however, figures are scarce and incomplete for the number of widows who died by sati before the advent of the British period.

In the early medieval era, sati was prevalent mainly among certain groups of feudal elites, but it became more widespread across Hindu social groups during the late medieval era. During the early-modern Mughal period, it was notably associated with elite Hindu Rajput clans in western India, marking one of the points of divergence between Hindu Rajputs and the Muslim Mughals, as Islam allows for widow remarriage. Several European travelogues of the period attest to Mughal opposition to sati, as well as efforts to restrict and regulate the practice among their Hindu subjects. Sati was also widespread in the Maratha country in 17th to early 19th centuries. It was historically less common in South India. Still, several instances were recorded in the region as well. In Bengal, sati was practised by the 12th century, and later increased among other castes such Bengali Brahmins between 1680 and 1830, after widows gained inheritance rights.

In the early 19th century, the British East India Company, in the process of extending its rule to most of India, initially tried to stop the practice; in 1803 Claudius Buchanan stated 275 cases, in 1804 he reported 115 cases that occurred between 15th April to 15th October. William Carey, a British evangelist missionary, noted 438 incidents within a 30-mile (48-km) radius of the capital, Calcutta, in 1803, despite its ban within Calcutta. Between 1815 and 1818, the number of documented sati incidents in the Bengal Presidency doubled, from 378 to 839. Opposition to the practice of sati by evangelists like Carey, and by Hindu reformers such as Raja Ram Mohan Roy ultimately led the British Governor-General of India Lord William Bentinck to enact the Bengal Sati Regulation, 1829, declaring the practice of burning or burying alive of Hindu widows to be punishable by the criminal courts. Rejecting a petition by 800 orthodox Hindus against the ban, the Privy Council upheld the ban on Sati practice in 1832. Isolated incidents of sati were recorded in India in the late 20th century, leading the Government of India to promulgate the Sati (Prevention) Act, 1987, criminalising the aiding or glorifying of sati.

== Etymology and usage ==
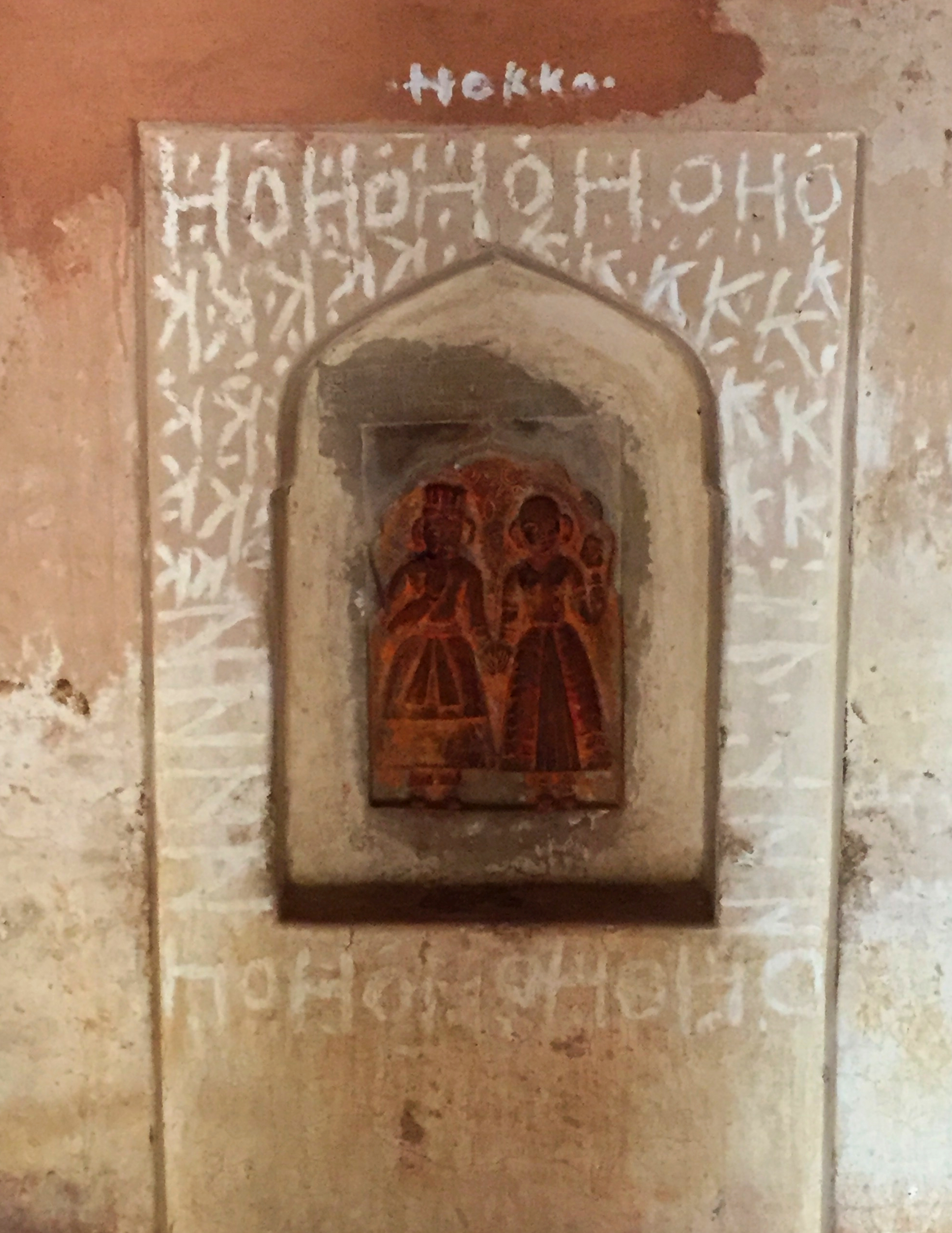
Orchha Sati Shrine

The practice is named after the Hindu goddess Sati, who is believed to have self-immolated because she was unable to bear her father Daksha's humiliation of her and her husband Shiva. The word sati was originally interpreted as 'chaste woman' and it appears in Hindi and Sanskrit texts where it is synonymous with 'good wife', therefore, initially referring to the woman, rather than the rite. The word suttee was commonly used by Anglo-Indian English writers. Variants are:

- Sativrata, an uncommon and seldom used term, denotes the woman who makes a vow (vrata), to protect her husband while he is alive and then die with her husband.
- Satimata denotes a venerated widow who committed sati.

The rite itself had technical names:

- Sahagamana ('going with') or sahamarana ('dying with').
- Anvarohana ('ascension' to the pyre) is occasionally met, as well as satidaha as terms to designate the process.
- Satipratha is also, on occasion, used as a term signifying the custom of burning widows alive.

The Indian Commission of Sati (Prevention) Act, 1987 Part I, Section 2(c) defines sati as the act or rite itself, of "burning or burying alive".

The spelling suttee is a phonetic spelling using 19th-century English orthography. The satī transliteration uses the more modern ISO/IAST (International Alphabet of Sanskrit Transliteration), the academic standard for writing the Sanskrit language with the Latin alphabet system.

== Origin and spread ==
The origins and spread of the practice of sati are complex and much debated questions, without a general consensus. It has been speculated that rituals, such as widow sacrifice or widow burning, have prehistoric roots. (Note: Early 20th-century pioneering anthropologist James G. Frazer thought that the legendary Greek story of Capaneus, whose wife Evadne threw herself on his funeral pyre, might be a relic of an earlier custom of live widow-burning. In Book 10 of Quintus Smyrnaeus' Posthomerica (lines 467ff.), Oenone is said to have thrown herself on the burning pyre of her erstwhile husband Paris, or Alexander. The strangling of widows after their husbands' deaths are attested to from cultures as disparate as the Natchez people in present-day Louisiana, to a number of Pacific Islander cultures. Ahmad ibn Fadlan describes a 10th-century CE ship burial of the Rus'. When a female slave had said she would be willing to die, her body was subsequently burned with her master on the pyre.) The archaeologist Elena Efimovna Kuzmina has listed several parallels between the burial practices of the ancient Asiatic steppe Andronovo cultures (fl. 1800–1400 BCE) and the Vedic Age. She considers sati to be a largely symbolic double burial or a double cremation, a feature she argues is to be found in both cultures, with neither culture observing it strictly.

=== Proto-Indo-European roots ===
Comparative linguistics and mythology suggest that the roots of widow sacrifice may date back to Proto-Indo-European (PIE) society. In early Indo-European traditions, the ritual is believed to have originally taken a symbolic form, as reflected in the Rigveda (10.18.8), where a widow is instructed to briefly lie down next to her deceased husband on the funeral pyre before being called back to the world of the living by a relative. Over time, this shared Indo-European heritage evolved along different trajectories; while it remained symbolic or faded in some regions, it manifested as literal widow immolation or execution across several ancient branches, including the Thracians (Note: The 5th-century BCE Greek historian Herodotus documented that among specific Thracian tribes, when a man died, his multiple wives would engage in a fierce competition to determine whom he had loved most. The woman judged to be the favorite was praised by onlookers, ritually killed by her nearest relative over the husband's grave, and buried alongside him, while the surviving wives considered it a great disgrace.), early Slavs, (Note: Early medieval geographic accounts by Arab chroniclers like Ibn Rustah indicate that widow burning was highly prevalent among early Slavic tribes. When a married Slavic man died, his wife would willingly or under heavy societal compulsion allow herself to be cremated alive on his funeral pyre, driven by the theological conviction that she would enter paradise with him.) Norse, (Note: A vivid eyewitness account of Norse funerary practices was recorded in 922 CE by the Arab diplomat Ahmad ibn Fadlan along the Volga river. During the ship cremation of a wealthy Norse chieftain, a female slave volunteered to accompany him to the afterlife; she underwent a multi-day ritual where she was elevated to symbolic wife status, before being ritually strangled and stabbed by an old woman known as the "Angel of Death" and burned alongside her master. Archaeological evidence, such as the 9th-century Oseberg ship burial, corroborates the practice of burying secondary female companions alongside elite individuals.) and Germanic tribes, (Note: Writing in the 6th century CE, the Byzantine historian Procopius recorded that the Heruli maintained highly primitive customs. According to his accounts, Herulian law strictly compelled a widow to commit suicide by hanging herself directly at her husband's tomb; if she failed to do so, she faced permanent infamy and hostility from her deceased husband's family.) before eventually crystallising into the historical practice of sati on the Indian subcontinent. While classical Greece did not practice literal widow burning, clear cultural remnants of the Indo-European tradition survive in Greek mythology. A prominent example occurs in the legend of Evadne, who, out of consuming grief and devotion, threw herself directly onto the flaming funeral pyre of her husband Capaneus after he was slain during the siege of Thebes.

=== Vedic symbolic practice ===
According to Romila Thapar, in the Vedic period, when "mores of the clan gave way to the norms of caste", wives were obliged to join in quite a few rituals but without much authority. A ritual with support in a Vedic text was a "symbolic self-immolation" which it is believed a widow of status needed to perform at the death of her husband, the widow subsequently marrying her husband's brother. In later centuries, the text was cited as the origin of Sati, with a variant reading allowing the authorities to insist that the widow sacrifice herself in reality by joining her deceased husband on the funeral pyre.

Anand A. Yang notes that the Rig Veda refers to a "mimetic ceremony" where a "widow lay on her husband's funeral pyre before it was lit but was raised from it by a male relative of her dead husband." According to Yang, the word agre, "to go forth", was (probably in the 16th century) mistranslated into agneh, "into the fire", to give Vedic sanction for sati.

=== Early medieval origins ===
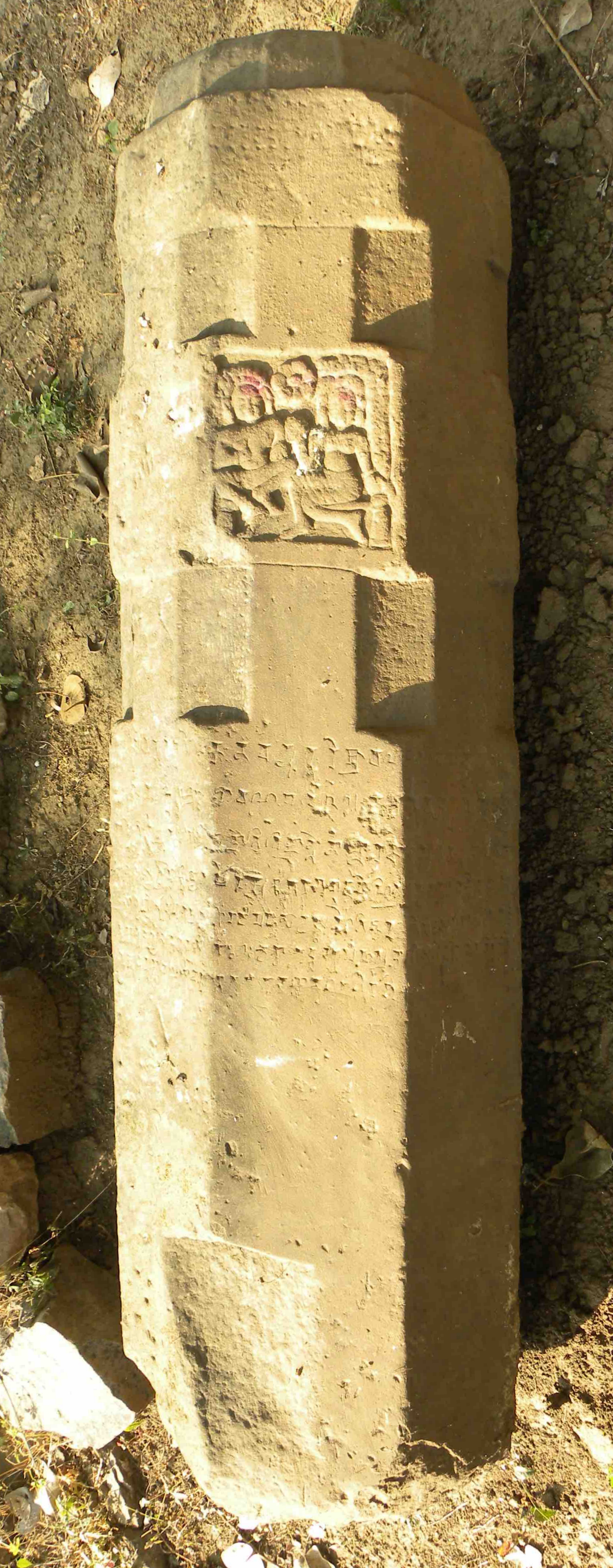
The Eran inscription of Goparaja is considered as the earliest known Sati stone in India (circa 510 CE). The inscription explains: he "went to heaven, becoming equal to Indra, the best of the gods; and [his] devoted, attached, beloved, and beauteous wife, clinging [to him], entered into the mass of fire (funeral pyre)".

Sati as the burning of a widow with her deceased husband seems to have been introduced in the pre-Gupta era, since 500 CE. Vidya Dehejia states that sati was forced into Indian society through Hindu cultural practice, and became active practice after 500 CE. According to Ashis Nandy, the practice became prevalent from vedas and declined to its elimination in the 17th century to gain resurgence in Bengal in the 18th century from British ethical involvement. Historian Roshen Dalal postulates that its mention in some of the Puranas indicates that it slowly grew in prevalence from 5th–7th century and later became an accepted custom around 1000 CE among those of higher classes, especially the Rajputs. One of the stanzas in the Mahabharata describes Madri's suicide by sati, but is likely an interpolation given that it has contradictions with the succeeding verses.

According to Dehejia, sati originated within the Kshatriya (warrior) aristocracy and remained mostly limited to the warrior class among Hindus. According to Thapar, the introduction and growth of the practice of sati as a forced fire sacrifice is related to new Kshatriyas, who forged their own culture and took some rules "rather literally", with a variant reading of the Veda turning the symbolic practice into the practice of pushing a widow and burning her with her husband. Thapar further points to the "subordination of women in patriarchal society", "changing 'systems of kinship'", and "control over female sexuality" as factors in the rise of sati.

=== Medieval spread ===
The practice of sati was emulated by those seeking to achieve high status of the royalty and the warriors as part of the process of Sanskritisation, but its spread was also related to the centuries of Islamic invasion and its expansion in South Asia, and to the hardship and marginalisation that widows endured.

Sati acquired an additional meaning as a means to preserve the honour of women whose men had been slain, akin to the practice of jauhar, with the ideologies of jauhar and sati reinforcing each other. Jauhar was originally a self-chosen death for queens and noblewomen facing defeat in war, and practised especially among the warrior Rajputs. Oldenburg posits that the enslavement of women by Greek conquerors may have started this practice, Oldenburg attested the Rajput practice of jauhar during wars, and notes that the kshatriyas or Rajput castes, not the Brahmins, were the most respected community in Rajasthan in north-west India, as they defended the land against invaders centuries before the coming of the Muslims. She proposes that Brahmins of the north-west copied Rajput practices, and transformed sati ideologically from the 'brave woman' into the 'good woman'. From those Brahmins, the practice spread to other non-warrior castes.

According to David Brick of Yale University, sati, which was initially rejected by the Brahmins of Kashmir, spread among them in the later half of the first millennium. Brick's evidence for claiming this spread is the mention of sati-like practices in the Vishnu Smriti (700–1000 CE), which is believed to have been written in Kashmir. Brick argues that the author of the Vishnu Smriti may have been mentioning practices existing in his own community. Brick notes that the dates of other Dharmasastra texts mentioning sahagamana are not known with certainty, but posits that the priestly class throughout India was aware of the texts and the practice itself by the 12th century. According to Anand Yang, it was practised in Bengal as early as the 12th century, where it was originally practised by the Kshatriya caste and later spread to other upper and lower castes including Brahmins. Julia Leslie writes that the practice increased among Bengali Brahmins between 1680 and 1830, after widows gained inheritance rights.

=== Colonial era revival ===
Sati practice resumed during the colonial era, particularly in significant numbers in colonial Bengal. Three factors may have contributed this revival: sati was believed to be supported by Hindu scriptures by the 19th century; sati was encouraged by unscrupulous neighbours as it was a means of property annexation from a widow who had the right to inherit her dead husband's property under Hindu law, and sati helped eliminate the inheritor; poverty was so extreme during the 19th century that sati was a means of escape for a woman with no means or hope of survival.

Daniel Grey states that the understanding of origins and spread of sati were distorted in the colonial era because of a concerted effort to push "problem Hindu" theories in the 19th and early 20th centuries. Lata Mani wrote that all of the parties during the British colonial era that debated the issue subscribed to the belief in a "golden age" of Indian women followed by a decline in concurrence to the Muslim conquests. This discourse also resulted in promotion of a view of British missionaries rescuing "Hindu India from Islamic tyranny". Several British missionaries who had studied classical Indian literature attempted to employ Hindu scriptural interpretations in their missionary work to convince their followers that Sati was not mandated by Hinduism.

== History ==
=== Earliest records ===
==== Early Greek sources ====
Among those that do reference the practice, the lost works of the Greek historian Aristobulus of Cassandreia, who travelled to India with the expedition of Alexander the Great in c. 327 BCE, are preserved in the fragments of Strabo. There are different views by authors on what Aristobulus hears as widows of one or more tribes in India performing self-sacrifice on the husband's pyre, one author also mentions that widows who declined to die were held in disgrace. In contrast, Megasthenes who visited India during 300 BCE does not mention any specific reference to the practice, which Dehejia takes as an indication that the practice was non-existent then.

Diodorus writes about the wives of Ceteus, the Indian captain of Eumenes, competing for burning themselves after his death in the Battle of Paraitakene (317 BCE). The younger one is permitted to mount the pyre. Modern historians believe Diodorus's source for this episode was the eyewitness account of the now lost historian Hieronymus of Cardia. Hieronymus' explanation of the origin of sati appears to be his own composite, created from a variety of Indian traditions and practices to form a moral lesson upholding traditional Greek values. Modern scholarship has generally treated this instance as an isolated incident, not representative of general culture.

Two other independent sources that mention widows who voluntarily joined their husbands' pyres as a mark of their love are Cicero and Nicolaus of Damascus.

==== Early Sanskrit sources ====
Some of the early Sanskrit authors like Daṇḍin in Daśakumāracarita and Banabhatta in Harshacharita mention that women who burnt themselves wore extravagant dresses. Bana tells about Yasomati who, after choosing to mount the pyre, bids farewell to her relatives and servants. She then decks herself in jewelry which she later distributes to others. Although Prabhakaravardhana's death is expected, Arvind Sharma suggests it is another form of sati. The same work mentions Harsha's sister Rajyasri trying to commit sati after her husband died. In Kadambari, Bana greatly opposes sati and gives examples of women who did not choose sahgamana.

==== Sangam literature ====
Padma Sree asserts that other evidence for some form of sati comes from Sangam literature in Tamilakam: for instance the Silappatikaram written in the 2nd century CE. In this tale, Kannagi, the chaste wife of her wayward husband Kovalan, burns Madurai to the ground when her husband is executed unjustly, then climbs a cliff to join Kovalan in heaven. She became an object of worship as a chaste wife, called Pattini in Sinhala and Kannagiamman in Tamil, and is still worshipped today. An inscription in an urn burial from the 1st century CE tells of a widow who told the potter to make the urn big enough for both her and her husband. The Manimekalai similarly provides evidence that such practices existed in Tamil lands, and the Purananuru claims widows prefer to die with their husband due to the dangerous negative power associated with them. However she notes that this glorification of sacrifice was not unique to women: just as the texts glorified "good" wives who sacrificed themselves for their husbands and families, "good" warriors similarly sacrificed themselves for their kings and lands. It is even possible that the sacrifice of the "good" wives originated from the warrior sacrifice tradition. Today, such women are still worshipped as Gramadevis throughout South India.

==== Inscriptional evidence ====
According to Axel Michaels, the first inscriptional evidence of the practice is from Nepal in 464 CE, and in India from 510 CE. The early evidence suggests that widow-burning practice was seldom carried out in the general population. Centuries later, instances of sati began to be marked by inscribed memorial stones called Sati stones. According to J.C. Harle, the medieval memorial stones appear in two forms – viragal (hero stone) and satigal (sati stone), each to memorialise something different. Both of these are found in many regions of India, but "rarely if ever earlier in date than the 8th or 9th century". Numerous memorial sati stones appear 11th-century onwards, states Michaels, and the largest collections are found in Rajasthan. There have been few instances of sati in the Chola Empire of South India. Vanavan Mahadevi, the mother of Rajaraja Chola I (10th century) and Viramahadevi the queen of Rajendra Chola I (11th century) both committed Sati upon their husband's death by ascending the pyre. The 510 CE inscription at Eran mentioning the wife of Goparaja, a vassal of Bhanugupta, burning herself on her husband's pyre is considered to be a Sati stone.

=== Practice in Hindu-influenced cultures outside India ===
The early 14th-century CE traveler of Pordenone mentions wife burning in Zampa (Champa), in nowadays south/central Vietnam. (Note: Hindu and Buddhist influences arrived in Vietnam by early centuries of 1st millennium, likely from trade and the Cambodian Khmer influence. In the 10th century CE, Mahayana Buddhism became the officially sponsored religion. From the 11th century and thereafter, Buddhism in Vietnam incorporated many Chinese Confucian influences.) Anant Altekar states that sati spread with Hindu migrants to Southeast Asian islands, such as to Java, Sumatra and Bali. According to Dutch colonial records, this was however a rare practice in Indonesia, one found in royal households.

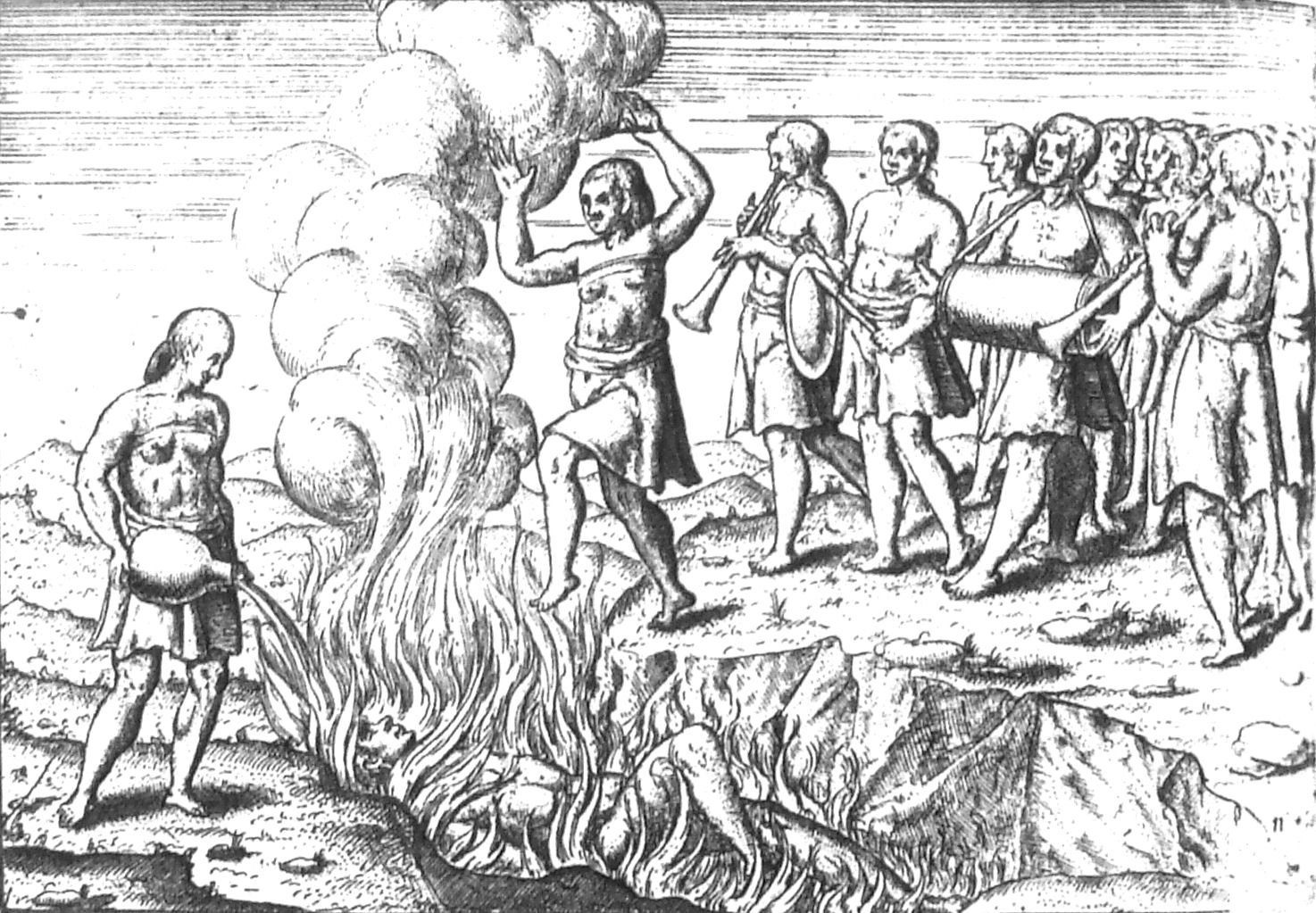
Description of the Balinese rite of self-sacrifice or Suttee, in Frederik de Houtman's 1597 Verhael vande Reyse ... Naer Oost Indien

In Cambodia, both the lords and the wives of a dead king voluntarily burnt themselves in the 15th and 16th centuries. (Note: Hindu and Buddhist influences arrived in Cambodia by the mid 1st millennium, likely over both land trading routes and maritime Asian trade. Mahayana Buddhism likely arrived in the 5th or 6th century CE. Mahayana competed with Hinduism from the 8th century onwards, as Khmer kings switched their royal support as they warred with Siam kings, with Mahayana becoming the officially sponsored religion in the 12th century and Theravada starting to arrive. From the 15th century and thereafter, Theravada Buddhism replaced Mahayana, and became the predominant religion.) According to European traveller accounts, in 15th century Mergui, in present-day extreme south Myanmar, widow burning was practised. A Chinese pilgrim from the 15th century seems to attest to the practice on islands called Ma-i-tung and Ma-i (possibly Belitung (outside Sumatra) and Northern Philippines, respectively).

According to the historian K.M. de Silva, Christian missionaries in Sri Lanka with a substantial Hindu minority population, reported "there were no glaring social evils associated with the indigenous religions-no sati, (...). There was thus less scope for the social reformer." However, although sati was non-existent in the colonial era, earlier Muslim travelers such as Sulaiman al-Tajir reported that sati was optionally practised, which a widow could choose to undertake.

=== Mughal Empire (1526–1857) ===
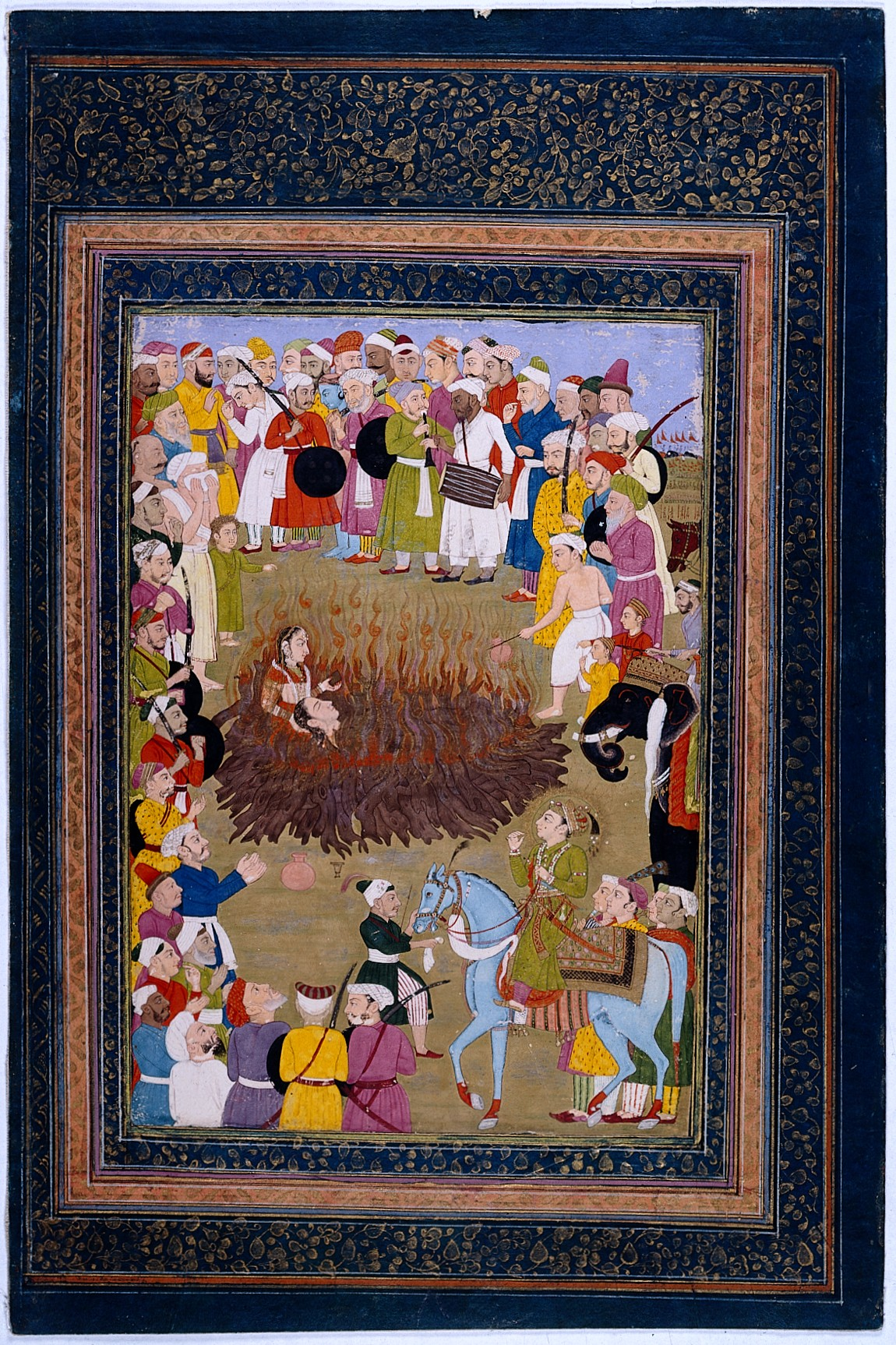
A painting by Mohammad Rizā showing a Hindu princess committing Sati against the wishes but with the reluctant approval of Emperor Akbar. In the right foreground, attending the Sati on horseback, is the third son of Akbar, Prince Dāniyāl.

Prior to the Mughal era, Delhi Sultanate rulers such as Alauddin Khilji and Muhammad bin Tughlaq (13th–14th century) sought to require permission prior to any sati, but this "became a mere formality and in any event did not apply to Hindu women from royal families". The Moroccan traveller Ibn Battuta witnessed a sati ceremony during his stay in the Delhi Sultanate in the fourteenth century and recorded a detailed description in his Rihla.

The second Mughal emperor Humayun was reported to have issued a ban on sati but subsequently withdrew it. Under Akbar (r. 1556–1605), sati became a regulated practice requiring permission from Mughal governors (kotwals), "who were instructed to delay the woman's decision for as long as possible", "demanded a steep fee for such permission", and offered "pensions, gifts and other help" to dissuade widows from sati.

Later Mughal obstacles to the practice were difficult to enforce outside of imperial centres such as Agra. Mughal governors under Jahangir, and contemporary rulers of the Deccan Sultanates "attempted to dissuade requests" but did not prohibit the practice, and permitted it for a fee. After Aurangzeb issued an order against sati in 1663, the practice declined in Mughal realms, but did not disappear, and the order could be evaded through bribing of officials.

==== Ambivalence of Mughal rulers ====
According to Annemarie Schimmel, the Mughal Emperor Akbar I (r. 1556–1605) was averse to the practice of Sati; however, he expressed his admiration for "widows who wished to be cremated with their deceased husbands". He was averse to abuse, and in 1582, Akbar issued a decree to prevent any use of compulsion in sati. According to M. Reza Pirbhai, a professor of South Asian and World history, it is unclear if a prohibition on sati was issued by Akbar, and other than a claim of ban by Monserrate upon his insistence, no other primary sources mention an actual ban. Instances of sati continued during and after the era of Akbar. (Note: For example, according to a poem, Sūz u gudāz ("Burning and melting") by Muhammad Riza Nau'i of Khasbushan (d. 1610), Akbar attempted to prevent a sati by calling a widow before him and offering her wealth and protection. The poet reports hearing the story from Prince Dāniyāl, Akbar's third son. According to Arvind Sharma, a professor of Comparative Religion specializing on Hinduism, the widow "rejected all this persuasion as well as the counsel of the Brahmins, and would neither speak nor hear of anything but the Fire". According to Sharma, "in most accounts of sati of the pre-17th century period, in which the role of the Brahamanas can be identified, they appear in the role of persons dissuading the widow from committing sati.")

Jahangir (r. 1605–1627), who succeeded Akbar in the early 17th century, found sati prevalent among the Hindus of Rajaur, Kashmir. The reaction to sati was not uniform across different cultural groups. While Hindus were generally more accepting of it, some Muslims also expressed occasional admiration, though the dominant attitude was disapproval. Sushil Chaudhury highlights that Muslim sources often avoided detailed discussions about it, apart from occasional references. Overall, both admiration and criticism of sati cut across cultural lines, with examples of support from Greeks, Muslims, and British individuals, and opposition from Hindus, dating back as far as the seventh century. According to Chaudhury, the evidence suggests that sati was admired by Hindus, but both "Hindus and Muslims went in large numbers to witness a sati and sati was almost universally admired by people in mediaeval India." According to Reza Pirbhai, the memoirs of Jahangir suggest sati continued in his regime, was practised by Hindus and Muslims, he was fascinated by the custom, and that those Kashmiri Muslim widows who practised sati either immolated themselves or buried themselves alive with their dead husbands. Jahangir prohibited such sati and other customary practices in Kashmir.

Aurangzeb (r. 1658–1707) issued another order in 1663, states Sheikh Muhammad Ikram, after returning from Kashmir, "in all lands under Mughal control, never again should the officials allow a woman to be burnt". The Aurangzeb order, states Ikram, though mentioned in the formal histories, is recorded in the official records of Aurangzeb's time. Although Aurangzeb's orders could be evaded with payment of bribes to officials, adds Ikram, later European travelers record that sati was not much practised in the Mughal Empire, and that Sati was "very rare, except it be some Rajah's wives, that the Indian women burn at all" by the end of Aurangzeb's reign.

==== Descriptions by Westerners ====
The memoirs of European merchants and travelers, as well the colonial era Christian missionaries of British India described Sati practices under Mughal rulers. Ralph Fitch noted in 1591:

When the husband died his wife is burned with him, if she be alive, if she will not, her head is shaven, and then is never any account made of her after.

François Bernier (1620–1688) gave the following description:

At Lahor I saw a most beautiful young widow sacrificed, who could not, I think, have been more than twelve years of age. The poor little creature appeared more dead than alive when she approached the dreadful pit: the agony of her mind cannot be described; she trembled and wept bitterly; but three or four of the Brahmens, assisted by an old woman who held her under the arm, forced the unwilling victim toward the fatal spot, seated her on the wood, tied her hands and feet, lest she should run away, and in that situation the innocent creature was burnt alive.

The Spanish missionary Domingo Navarrete wrote in 1670 of different styles of Sati during Aurangzeb's time.

=== British and other European colonial powers ===
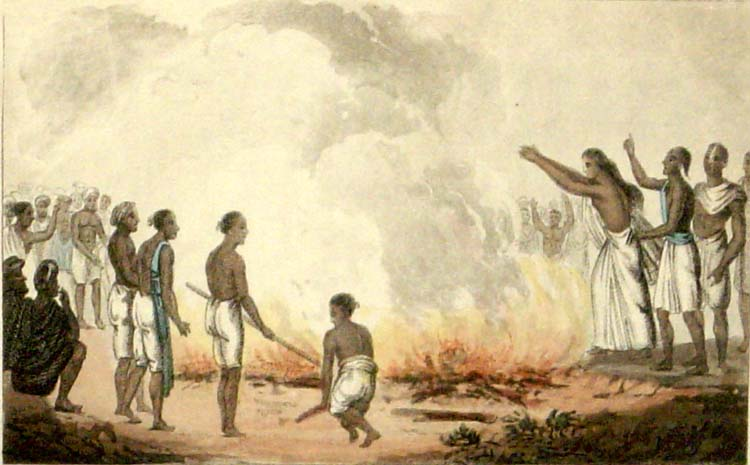
A Hindu widow burning herself with the corpse of her husband, 1820s, by the London-based illustrator Frederic Shoberl from traveler accounts

==== Non-British colonial powers in India ====
Afonso de Albuquerque banned sati immediately after the Portuguese conquest of Goa in 1510. Local Brahmins convinced the newly arrived Francisco Barreto to rescind the ban in 1555 in spite of protests from the local Christians and the Church authorities, but the ban was reinstated in 1560 by Constantino de Bragança with additional serious criminal penalties (including loss of property and liberty) against those encouraging the practice.

The Dutch and the French banned it in Chinsurah and Pondichéry, their respective colonies. The Danes, who held the small territories of Tranquebar and Serampore, permitted it until the 19th century.

==== Early British policy ====
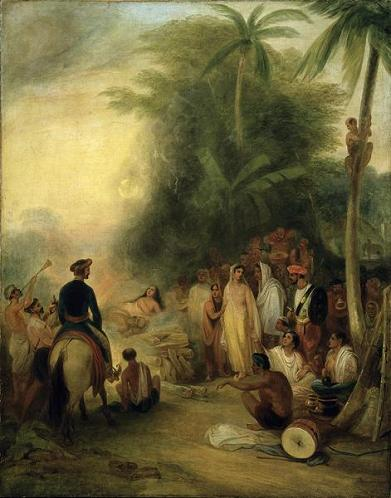
Suttee, by James Atkinson 1831

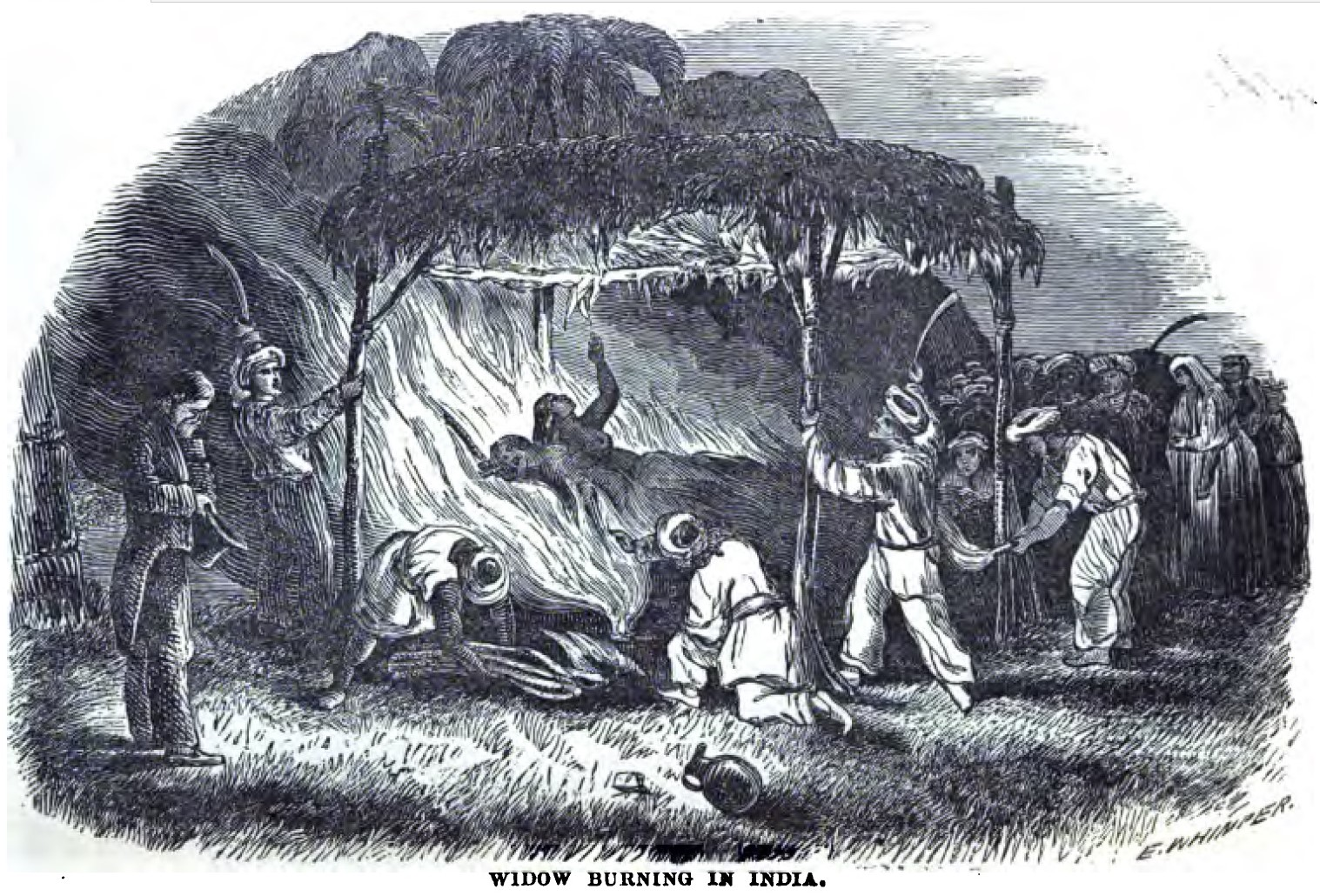
Widow Burning in India (August 1852), by the Wesleyan Missionary Society

The first official British response to sati was in 1680 when the Agent of Madras Streynsham Master intervened and prohibited the burning of a Hindu widow in Madras Presidency. Attempts to limit or ban the practice had been made by individual British officers, but without the backing of the East India Company. This is because it followed a policy of non-interference in Hindu religious affairs and there was no legislation or ban against Sati. The first formal British ban was imposed in 1798, in the city of Calcutta only. The practice continued in surrounding regions. In the beginning of the 19th century, the evangelical church in Britain, and its members in India, started campaigns against sati. This activism came about during a period when British missionaries in India began focusing on promoting and establishing Christian educational systems as a distinctive contribution of theirs to the missionary enterprise as a whole. Leaders of these campaigns included William Carey and William Wilberforce. These movements put pressure on the company to ban the act. William Carey, and the other missionaries at Serampore conducted in 1803–04 a census on cases of sati for a region within a 30-mile radius of Calcutta, finding more than 300 such cases there. The missionaries also approached Hindu theologians, who opined that the practice was encouraged, rather than enjoined by the Hindu scriptures.

Serampore was a Danish colony, rather than British, and the reason why Carey started his mission in Danish India, rather than in British territories, was because the East India Company did not accept Christian missionary activity within their domains. In 1813, when the Company's Charter came up for renewal William Wilberforce, drawing on the statistics on sati collected by Carey and the other Serampore missionaries and mobilising public opinion against suttee, successfully ensured the passage of a Bill in Parliament legalising missionary activities in India, with a view to ending the practice through the religious transformation of Indian society. He stated in his address to the House of Commons:

Let us endeavour to strike our roots into the soil by the gradual introduction and establishment of our own principles and opinions; of our laws, institutions and manners; above all, as the source of every other improvement, of our religion and consequently of our morals

Elijah Hoole in his book Personal Narrative of a Mission to the South of India, from 1820 to 1828 reports an instance of Sati at Bangalore, which he did not personally witness. Another missionary, Mr. England, reports witnessing Sati in the Bangalore Civil and Military Station on 9 June 1826. However, these practices were very rare after the Government of Madras cracked down on the practice from the early 1800s (p. 82).

The British authorities within the Bengal Presidency started systematically to collect data on the practice in 1815.

==== Principal reformers and 1829 ban ====
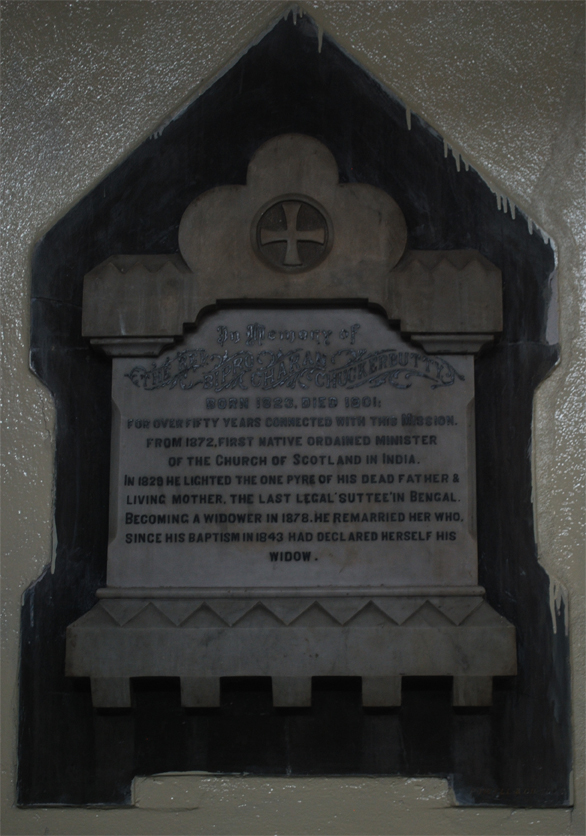
Plaque of Last Legal Sati of Bengal, Scottish Church College, Kolkata

The principal campaigners against Sati were Christian and Hindu reformers such as William Carey and Ram Mohan Roy. In 1799 Carey, a Baptist missionary from England, first witnessed the burning of a widow on her husband's funeral pyre. Horrified by the practice, Carey and his coworkers Joshua Marshman and William Ward opposed sati from that point onward, lobbying for its abolishment. Known as the Serampore Trio, they published essays forcefully condemning the practice and presented an address against Sati to then Governor General of India, Lord Wellesley.

In 1812, Ram Mohan Roy began to champion the cause of banning sati practice. He was motivated by the experience of seeing his own sister-in-law being forced to die by sati. He visited Kolkata's cremation grounds to persuade widows against immolation, formed watch groups to do the same, sought the support of other elite Bengali classes, and wrote and disseminated articles to show that it was not required by Hindu scripture. He was at loggerheads with Hindu groups which did not want the Government to interfere in religious practices.

From 1815 to 1818 sati deaths doubled. Ram Mohan Roy launched an attack on sati that "aroused such anger that for awhile his life was in danger". In 1821 he published a tract opposing Sati, and in 1823 the Serampore missionaries led by Carey published a book containing their earlier essays, of which the first three chapters opposed Sati. Another Christian missionary published a tract against Sati in 1927.

Sahajanand Swami, the founder of the Swaminarayan sect, preached against the practice of sati in his area of influence, that is Gujarat. He argued that the practice had no Vedic standing and only God could take a life he had given. He also opined that widows could lead lives that would eventually lead to salvation. Sir John Malcolm, the Governor of Bombay supported Sahajanand Swami in this endeavour.

In 1828 Lord William Bentinck came to power as Governor-General of India. When he landed in Calcutta, he said that he felt "the dreadful responsibility hanging over his head in this world and the next, if... he was to consent to the continuance of this practice (sati) one moment longer." Bentinck decided to put an immediate end to sati. Ram Mohan Roy warned Bentinck against abruptly ending sati. However, after observing that the judges in the courts were unanimously in favour of reform, Bentinck proceeded to lay the draft before his council. Charles Metcalfe, the Governor's most prominent counselor expressed apprehension that the banning of sati might be "used by the disaffected and designing" as "an engine to produce insurrection". However these concerns did not deter him from upholding the Governor's decision "in the suppression of the horrible custom by which so many lives are cruelly sacrificed". Thus on Sunday morning of 4 December 1829 Lord Bentinck issued Regulation XVII declaring sati to be illegal and punishable in criminal courts. It was presented to William Carey for translation. His response is recorded as follows: "Springing to his feet and throwing off his black coat he cried, 'No church for me to-day... If I delay an hour to translate and publish this, many a widow's life may be sacrificed,' he said. By evening the task was finished."

==== Opposition to the ban ====
On 2 February 1830 this law was extended to Madras and Bombay. The ban was challenged by a petition signed by "several thousand... Hindoo inhabitants of Bihar, Bengal, Orissa etc" but was rejected by Lord William Bentinck. The first petition presented to Lord William Bentinck stated:

Under the sanction of immemorial usage as well as precept, Hindoo widows perform, of their own accord and pleasure, and for the benefit of their Husbands' souls and for their own, the sacrifice of self - immolation called Suttee which is not merely a sacred duty but a high privilege to her who sincerely believes in the doctrines of her religion and we humbly submit that any interference with a persuasion of so high and self - annihilating nature is not only an unjust and intolerant dictation into matters of conscience, but is likely wholly to fail in procuring the end proposed.

The matter went to the Privy Council in London, where the supporters argued that abolition harmed the constitutional guarantees of Indians and made a comparison between loyalties of Muslim subjects to that of Hindus. Ram Mohan Roy, along with British supporters, presented counter-petitions to Parliament in support of ending sati. The Privy Council rejected the petition in 1832, and the ban on sati was upheld.

After the ban, Balochi priests in the Sindh region complained to the British Governor, Charles Napier about what they claimed was a meddlement in a sacred custom of their nation. Napier replied:

Be it so. This burning of widows is your custom; prepare the funeral pile. But my nation has also a custom. When men burn women alive we hang them, and confiscate all their property. My carpenters shall therefore erect gibbets on which to hang all concerned when the widow is consumed. Let us all act according to national customs!

Thereafter, the account goes, no suttee took place.

Burton Stein states "as Roy pointed out, the conditions of the generality of women during their lives remained wretched, regardless of whether sati was legal or not." The families in Bengal continued abandoning widows after the ban, who were then forced to take up sex work for survival.

==== Princely states/Independent kingdoms ====
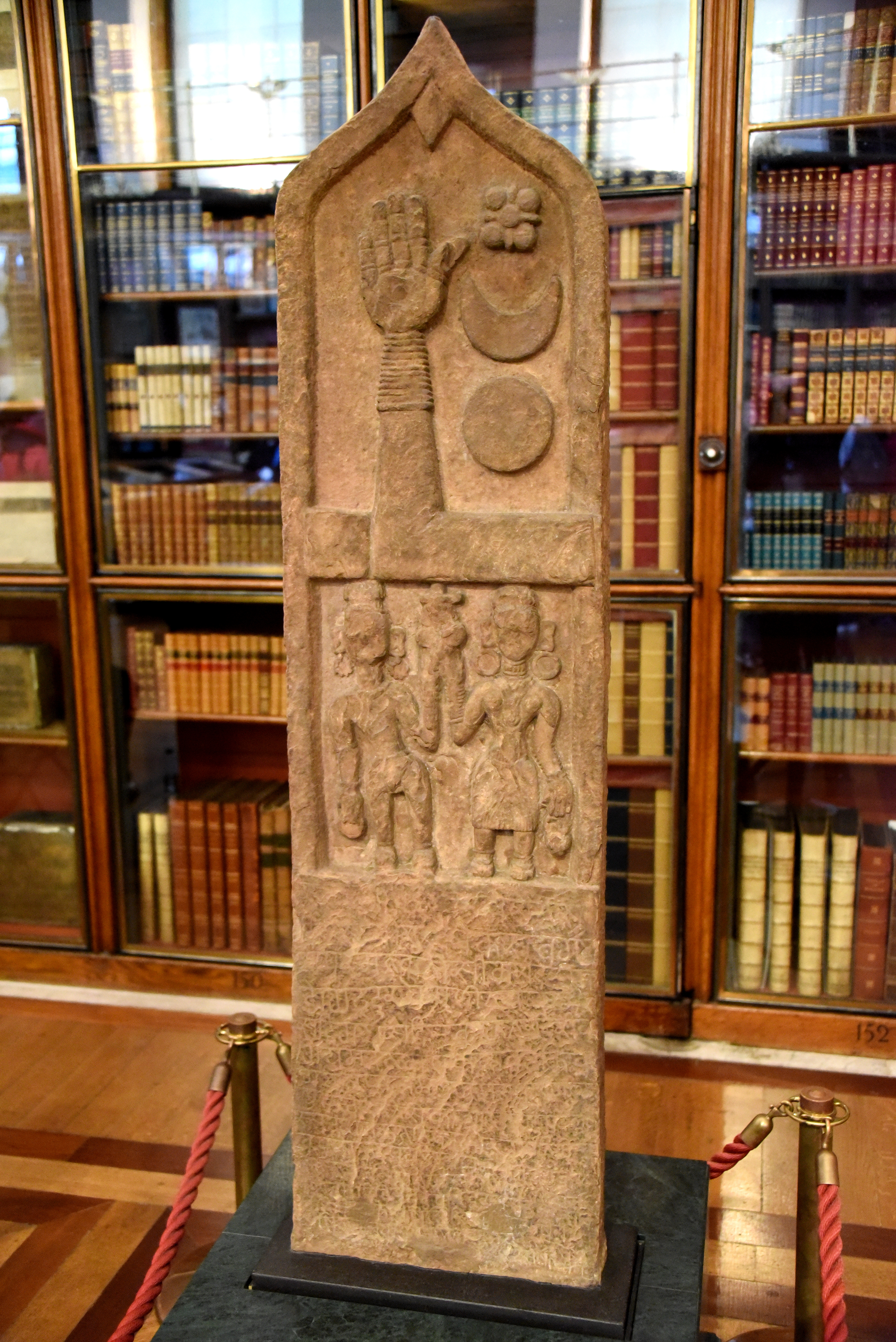
Sati Stone from the 18th century CE, now in the British Museum

Sati remained legal in some princely states for a time after it had been banned in lands under British control. Baroda and other princely states of Kathiawar Agency banned the practice in 1840, whereas Kolhapur followed them in 1841, the princely state of Indore some time before 1843. According to a speaker at the East India House in 1842, the princely states of Satara, Nagpur and Mysore had by then banned sati. Jaipur banned the practice in 1846, while Hyderabad, Gwalior and Jammu and Kashmir did the same in 1847. Awadh and Bhopal (both Muslim-ruled states) were actively suppressing sati by 1849. Cutch outlawed it in 1852 with Jodhpur having banned sati about the same time.

The 1846 abolition in Jaipur was regarded by many British as a catalyst for the abolition cause within Rajputana Agency; within 4 months after Jaipur's 1846 ban, 11 of the 18 independently governed states in Rajputana had followed Jaipur's example. One paper says that in the year 1846–1847 alone, 23 states in the whole of India (not just within Rajputana) had banned sati. It was not until 1861 that sati was legally banned in all the princely states of India, Mewar resisting for a long time before that time. The last legal case of sati within a princely state dates from 1861 in Udaipur the capital of Mewar, but as Anant S. Altekar shows, local opinion had then shifted strongly against the practice. The widows of Maharanna Sarup Singh declined to become sati upon his death, and the only one to follow him in death was a concubine. Later the same year, the general ban on sati was issued by a proclamation from Empress Victoria.

In some princely states such as Travancore, the custom of sati never prevailed, although it was held in reverence by the common people. For example, the regent Gowri Parvati Bayi was asked by the British Resident if he should permit a sati to take place in 1818, but the regent urged him not to do so, since the custom of sati had never been acceptable in her domains. In another state, Sawantwadi, the King Khem Sawant III (r. 1755–1803) is credited for having issued a positive prohibition of sati over a period of ten or twelve years. That prohibition from the 18th century may never have been actively enforced, or may have been ignored, since in 1843, the government in Sawantwadi issued a new prohibition of sati.

=== Post independence times ===
==== Legislative status of sati in present-day India ====
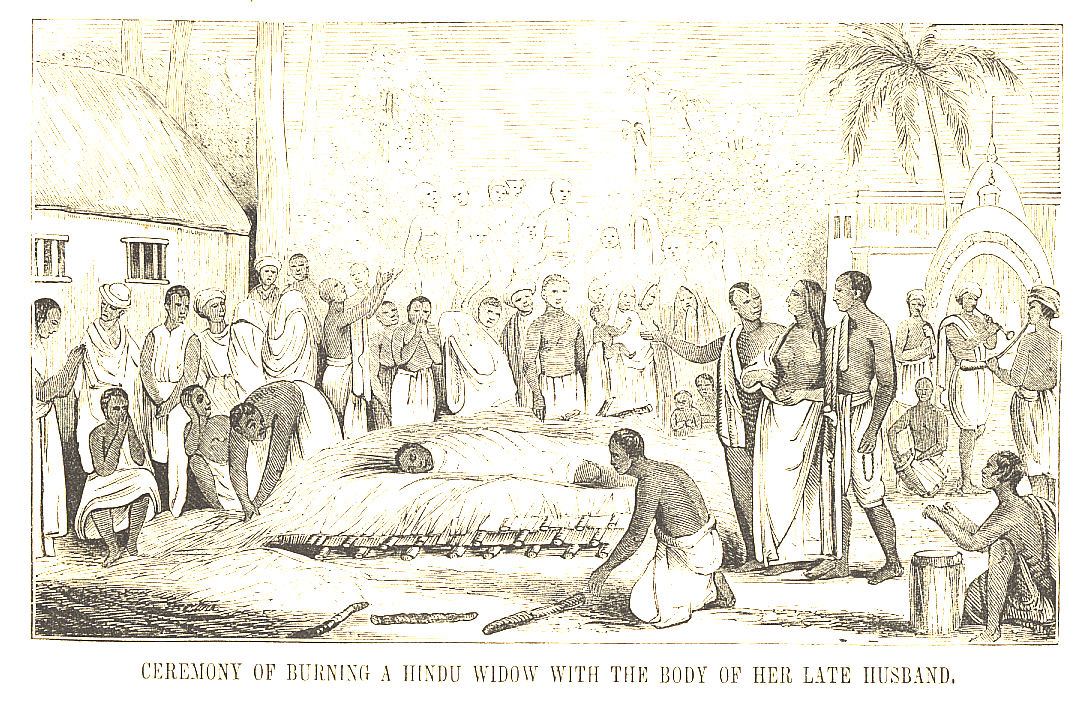
Ceremony of Burning a Hindu Widow with the Body of her Late Husband, from Pictorial History of China and India, 1851

Following the outcry after the sati of Roop Kanwar, the Government of India enacted the Rajasthan Sati Prevention Ordinance, 1987 on 1 October 1987. and later passed the Commission of Sati (Prevention) Act, 1987.

The Commission of Sati (Prevention) Act, 1987 Part I, Section 2(c) defines sati as:

The burning or burying alive of –

- (i) any widow along with the body of her deceased husband or any other relative or with any article, object or thing associated with the husband or such relative; or
- (ii) any woman along with the body of any of her relatives, irrespective of whether such burning or burying is claimed to be voluntary on the part of the widow or the women or otherwise

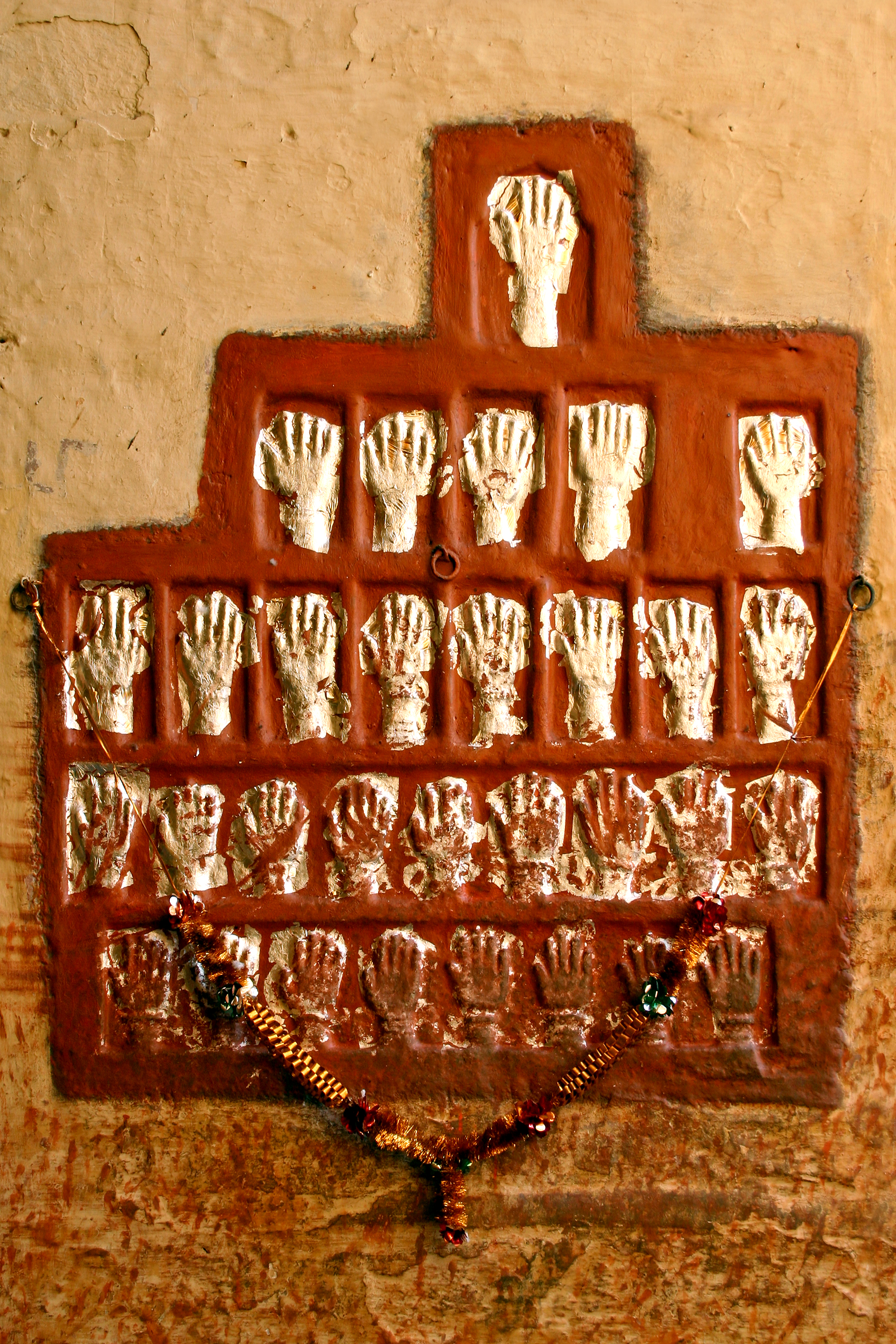
A shrine to queens of the Maharajas of Jodhpur who died by sati. The palmprints are typical.

The Prevention of Sati Act makes it illegal to support, glorify or attempt to die by sati. Support of sati, including coercing or forcing someone to die by sati, can be punished by death penalty or life imprisonment, while glorifying sati is punishable with one to seven years in prison.

Enforcement of these measures is not always consistent. The National Council of Women in India (NCWI) has suggested amendments to the law to remove some of these flaws. Prohibitions of certain practices, such as worship at ancient shrines, is a matter of controversy.

==== Enforcement of India's 1987 sati law ====
The passing of The Commission of Sati (Prevention) Act, 1987 was seen as an unprecedented move to many in India, and was hailed as a new era in the women's rights movement.

The Commission of Sati (Prevention) Act, 1987 appears to be facing its greatest challenge on the aspect of the law which penalises the glorification of Sati in Section 2 of this Act:

- (i) The observance of any ceremony or the taking out of a procession in connection with the commission of Sati; or
- (ii) The supporting, justifying or propagating of the practice of Sati in any manner; or
- (iii) The arranging of any function to eulogise the person who has committed Sati; or
- (iv) The creation of a trust, or the collection of funds, or the construction of a temple or other structure or the carrying on of any form of worship or the performance of any ceremony thereat, with a view to perpetuate the honour of, or to preserve the memory of, a person who has committed Sati.

The punishment for glorifying sati is a minimum one-year sentence that can be increased to seven years in prison and a minimum fine of 5,000 rupees that can be increased to 30,000 rupees. This Section of the Act has become heavily criticised by both sides of the Sati debate. Proponents of Sati argue against it, claiming the practice to be a part of Indian culture. Simultaneously, those against the practice of Sati also question the practicality of such a law, since it may be interpreted in a manner so as to punish the victim.

India continues to witness a cultural divide in regards to their opinions of Sati, with a great deal of the glorification of this practice occurring within it. The Calcutta Marwari have been noted to follow the practice of Sati worship, yet the community alleges it to be a part of their culture and insist they be permitted to follow their practices.

India is steeped in a heavily patriarchal system and their norms, making it difficult for even the most vigilant of authorities to enforce the 1987 Act. An instance of this can be seen in 2002 where two police officers were attacked by a mob of approximately 1,000 people when attempting to stop an instance of Sati.

==== Current situation ====
Some instances of Sati practice continue to occur in India in the present times. There were 30 reported cases of sati or attempted sati over a 44-year period (1943–1987) in India, the official number being 28. A well-documented case from 1987 was that of 18-year-old Roop Kanwar. In response to this incident, additional legislation against sati practice was passed, first within the state of Rajasthan, then federally by the Central Government of India.

In November 1999, a 55-year-old Dalit woman named Charan Shah committed sati in Satpura village, Uttar Pradesh. In 2002, a 65-year-old woman by the name of Kuttu died after sitting on her husband's funeral pyre in Panna district of Madhya Pradesh. On 18 May 2006, Vidyawati, a 35-year-old woman allegedly committed sati by jumping into the blazing funeral pyre of her husband in Rari-Bujurg Village, Fatehpur district, Uttar Pradesh.

On 24 April 2006, Sita Devi, a 78 year old widow burned to death on the funeral pyre of her husband in Bihar. On 21 August 2006, Janakrani, a 40-year-old woman, burned to death on the funeral pyre of her husband Prem Narayan in Sagar district; Janakrani had not been forced or prompted by anybody to commit the act.

On 11 October 2008 a 75-year-old woman, Lalmati Verma, committed sati by jumping into her 80-year-old husband's funeral pyre at Checher in the Kasdol block of Chhattisgarh's Raipur district; Verma killed herself after mourners had left the cremation site.

In December 2014, a 70-year-old woman reportedly committed Sati by jumping into the funeral pyre of her deceased husband in Saharsa district, Bihar. In May 2023, a 28-year-old woman in Ahmedabad committed suicide allegedly after her in-laws forced her to commit Sati following her husband's death.

Scholars debate whether these rare reports of sati by widows are related to culture or are examples of mental illness and suicide. In the case of Roop Kanwar, Dinesh Bhugra states that there is a possibility that the suicides could be triggered by "a state of depersonalization as a result of severe bereavement", then adds that it is unlikely that Kanwar had mental illness and culture likely played a role. However, Colucci and Lester state that none of the women reported by media to have committed sati had been given a psychiatric evaluation before their sati suicide and thus there is no objective data to ascertain if culture or mental illness was the primary driver behind their suicide. Inamdar, Oberfield and Darrell state that the women who commit sati are often "childless or old and face miserable impoverished lives" which combined with great stress from the loss of the only personal support may be the cause of a widow's suicide.

Bride burning is a related social and criminal issue seen from the early 20th century onwards, involving the deaths of women in India by intentionally set fires, the numbers of which far overshadow similar incidents involving men.

As of 2020, at least 250 sati temples existed in India in which prayer ceremonies, or pujas, were performed to glorify the goddess Sati; prayers were also performed to the practice of a wife immolating herself alive on a deceased husband's funeral pyre. (Note: Although recorded cases of sati have diminished dramatically, sati temples, where prayers, known as pujas are carried out and festivals organized to glorify both the patron goddess, Sati, the benevolent avatar of the mother goddess who immolated herself in response to her father's insults to her husband, as does the practice of a wife's self-immolation following her husband's death. Today, India has at least 250 sati temples and legal prohibitions are too vague to effectively prohibit pujas there.)

== Practice ==
Accounts describe numerous variants in the sati ritual. The majority of accounts describe the woman seated or lying down on the funeral pyre beside her dead husband. Many other accounts describe women walking or jumping into the flames after the fire had been lit, and some describe women seating themselves on the funeral pyre and then lighting it themselves.

=== Variations in procedure ===
Although sati is typically thought of as consisting of the procedure in which the widow is placed, or enters, or jumps, upon the funeral pyre of her husband, slight variations in funeral practice have been reported here as well, by region. For example, the mid-17th-century traveller Jean-Baptiste Tavernier claims that in some regions, the sati occurred by construction of a small hut, within which the widow and her husband were burnt, while in other regions, a pit was dug, in which the husband's corpse was placed along with flammable materials, into which the widow jumped after the fire had started. In mid-nineteenth-century Lombok, an island in today's Indonesia, the local Balinese aristocracy practised widow suicide on occasion; but only widows of royal descent could burn themselves alive (others were stabbed to death with a kris dagger first). At Lombok, a high bamboo platform was erected in front of the fire and, when the flames were at their strongest, the widow climbed up the platform and dived into the fire.

=== Live burials ===
Most Hindu communities, especially in North India, only bury the bodies of those under the age of two. Those older than two are customarily cremated. A few European accounts provide rare descriptions of Indian sati that included the burial of the widow with her dead husband. One of the drawings in the Portuguese Códice Casanatense shows the live burial of a Hindu widow in the 16th century. Jean-Baptiste Tavernier, a 17th-century world traveller and trader of gems, wrote that women were buried with their dead husbands along the Coast of Coromandel while people danced during the cremation rites.

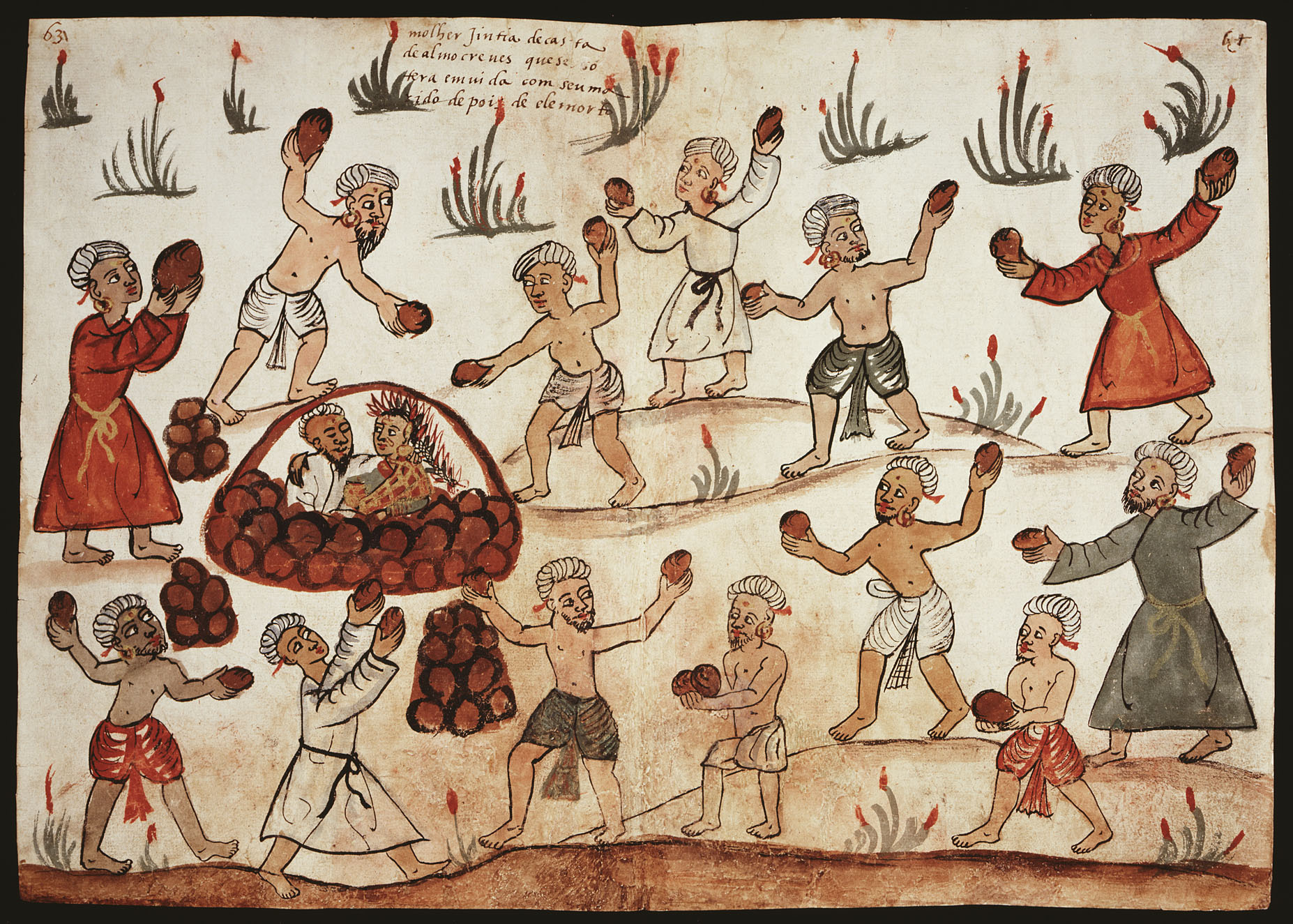
Hindu widow of Dhangar caste being buried alive with her dead husband's body. Source: Códice Casanatense (c. 1540).

The 18th-century Flemish painter Frans Balthazar Solvyns provided the only known eyewitness account of an Indian sati involving a burial. Solvyns states that the custom included the woman shaving her head, music and the event was guarded by East India Company soldiers. He expressed admiration for the Hindu woman, but also calls the custom barbaric.

The Commission of Sati (Prevention) Act, 1987 Part I, Section 2(c) includes within its definition of sati not just the act of burning a widow alive, but also that of burying her alive.

=== Compulsion ===
Sati is often described as voluntary, although in some cases it may have been forced. In one narrative account in 1785, the widow appears to have been drugged either with bhang or opium and was tied to the pyre which would have prevented her from escaping the fire, if she changed her mind.

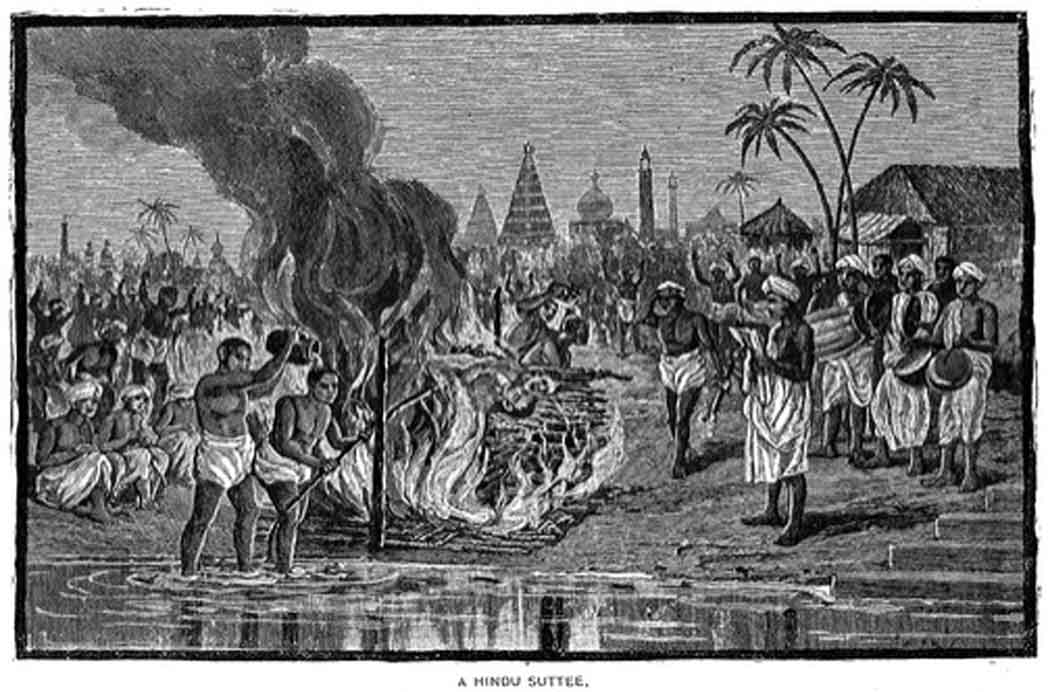
"A Hindu Suttee", 1885 book

The Anglo-Indian press of the period proffered several accounts of alleged forcing of the woman. As an example, The Calcutta Review published accounts as the following one:

In 1822, the Salt Agent at Barripore, 16 miles (26 km) south of Calcutta, went out of his way to report a case which he had witnessed, in which the woman was forcibly held down by a great bamboo by two men, so as to preclude all chance of escape. In Cuttack, a woman dropt herself into a burning pit, and rose up again as if to escape, when a washerman gave her a push with a bamboo, which sent her back into the hottest part of the fire. This is said to be based on the set of official documents. Yet another such case appearing in official papers, transmitted into British journals, is case 41, page 411 here, where the woman was, apparently, thrown twice back in the fire by her relatives, in a case from 1821.

Apart from accounts of direct compulsion, some evidence exists that precautions, at times, were taken so that the widow could not escape the flames once they were lit. Anant S. Altekar, for example, points out that it is much more difficult to escape a fiery pit that one has jumped in, than descending from a pyre one has entered on. He mentions the custom of the fiery pit as particularly prevalent in the Deccan and western India. From Gujarat and Uttar Pradesh, where the widow typically was placed in a hut along with her husband, her leg was tied to one of the hut's pillars. Finally, from Bengal, where the tradition of the pyre held sway, the widow's feet could be tied to posts fixed to the ground, she was asked three times if she wished to ascend to heaven, before the flames were lit.

Ram Mohan Roy observed that when women allow themselves to be consigned to the funeral pyre of a deceased husband it results not just "from religious prejudices only", but, "also from witnessing the distress in which widows of the same rank in life are involved, and the insults and slights to which they are daily subject".

The historian Anant Sadashiv Altekar states that some historical records suggest without doubt that instances of sati were forced, but overall the evidence suggests most instances were a voluntary act on the woman's part.

=== Symbolic sati ===
There have been accounts of symbolic sati in some Hindu communities. A widow lies down next to her dead husband, and certain parts of both the marriage ceremony and the funeral ceremonies are enacted, but without her death. An example in Sri Lanka is attested from modern times. Although this form of symbolic sati has contemporary evidence, it should by no means be regarded as a modern invention. For example, the ancient and sacred Atharvaveda, one of the four Vedas, believed to have been composed around 1000 BCE, describes a funerary ritual where the widow lies down by her deceased husband, but is then asked to ascend, to enjoy the blessings from the children and wealth left to her. Dehejia states that Vedic literature has no mention of any practice resembling sati. There is only one mention in the Vedas, of a widow lying down beside her dead husband who is asked to leave the grieving and return to the living, then prayer is offered for a happy life for her with children and wealth. Dehejia writes that this passage does not imply a pre-existing sati custom, nor of widow remarriage, nor that it is authentic verse; its solitary mention may also be explained as an insertion into the text at a latter date. Dehejia writes that no ancient or early medieval era Buddhist texts mention sati (since killing/self killing) would have been condemned by them.

In 20th-century India, a tradition developed of venerating jivit (living satis). A jivit is a woman who once desired to commit sati, but lives after having sacrificed her desire to die. Two famous jivit were Bala Satimata, and Umca Satimata, both lived until the early 1990s.

== Prevalence ==
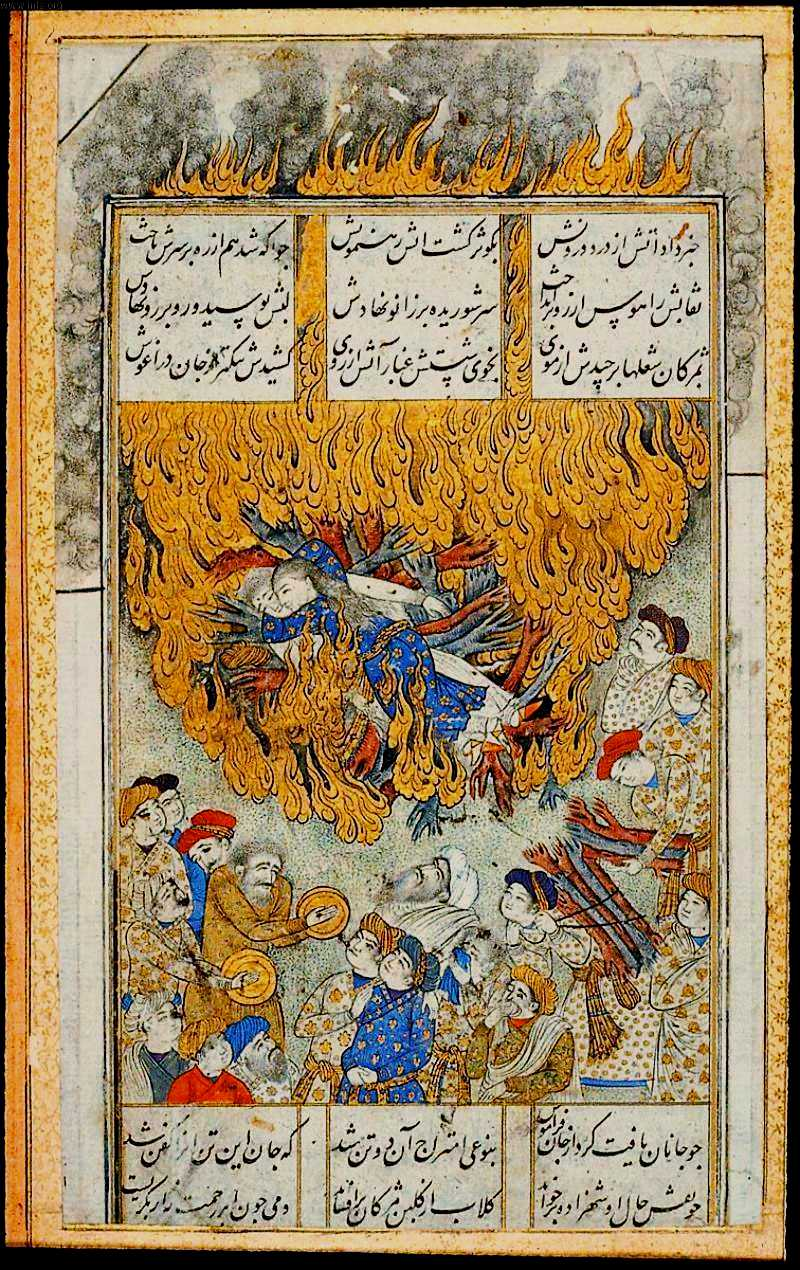
The bride throws herself on her husband's funeral pyre. This miniature painting made in Iran originates from the period of the Safavid dynasty, first half 17th century. (Attributed to the painter Muhammad Qasim.)

=== Numbers ===
==== Pre-colonial period ====
Records of sati exist throughout many times periods and regions of the subcontinent. However, there seems to have been major differences in different regions, and among communities. No reliable figures exist for the numbers who have died by sati in general. According to Yang, the "pre-1815" data is "scanty" and "fraught with problems".

==== Colonial period ====
An 1829 report by a Christian missionary organisation includes among other things, statistics on sati. It begins with a declaration that "the object of all missions to the heathen is to substitute for these systems the Gospel of Christ", thereafter lists sati for each year over the period 1815–1824, which totals 5,369, followed by a statement that a total of 5,997 instances of women were burned or buried alive in the Bengal Presidency over a 10-year period, i.e., average 600 per year. In the same report, it states that the Madras and Bombay presidencies totaled 635 instances of sati over the same ten-year period. The 1829 missionary report does not provide its sources and acknowledges that "no correct idea can be formed of the number of murders occasioned by suttees", then states that some of the statistics are based on "conjectures". According to Yang, these "numbers are fraught with problems".

William Bentinck, in an 1829 report, without specifying the year or period, stated that "of the 463 satis occurring in the whole of the Presidency of Fort William, (Note: at its greatest extent in 19th-century, this Presidency included modern era states of Uttar Pradesh, Madhya Pradesh, Bihar, Jharkhand, Odisha, West Bengal, parts of Assam, Tripura in India and modern era Bangladesh) 420 took place in Bengal, Behar, and Orissa, or what is termed the Lower Provinces, and of these latter 287 in the Calcutta Division alone". For the Upper Provinces, Bentinck added, "in these Provinces the satis amount to forty three only upon a population of nearly twenty millions", i.e., average one sati per 465,000.

=== Social composition and age distribution ===
Anand Yang, speaking of the early nineteenth century, says that contrary to conventional wisdom, sati was not, in general, an upper class phenomenon, but spread through the classes/castes. In the 575 reported cases from 1823, for example, 41 percent were Brahmins, 6 percent were Kshatriyas, 2 percent were Vaishiyas, and 51 percent were Shudras. In Banaras, in the 1815–1828 British records, the upper castes were only represented for 2 years—less than 70% of the total; whereas in 1821, all sati were from the upper castes there.

Yang notes that many studies seem to emphasise the young age of the widows who committed sati. By studying the British figures from 1815 to 1828, Yang states that the overwhelming majority were ageing women; statistics from 1825 to 1826 show that about two thirds were above the age of 40 when committing sati.

=== Regional variations of incidence ===
Anand Yang summarizes the regional variation in incidence of sati as follows:

... the practice was never generalized ... but was confined to certain areas: in the north ... the Gangetic Valley, Punjab and Rajasthan; in the west, to the southern Konkan region; and in the south, to Madurai and Vijayanagara.

==== Konkan/Maharashtra ====
Narayan H. Kulkarnee believes that sati came to be practised in 17th Century Maharashtra, initially by the Maratha nobility claiming Rajput descent. According to Kulkarnee, the practice may have increased across caste distinctions as an honour-saving custom in the face of Muslim advances into the territory. But the practice never gained the prevalence seen in Rajasthan or Bengal, and social customs of actively dissuading a widow from committing sati are well established. Apparently not a single instance of forced sati is attested for the 17th and 18th centuries CE. Forced or not forced, there were several instances of women from the Bhonsle dynasty committing sati. One was Shivaji's eldest childless widow, Putalabai, who committed sati after her husband's death. One controversial case was that of Chhatrapati Shahu I's widow who was forced to commit sati due to political intrigues regarding succession at the Satara court following Shahu's death in 1749. The most "celebrated" case of sati was that of Ramabai, the widow of Brahmin Peshwa Madhavrao I, who committed sati in 1772 on her husband's funeral pyre. This was considered unusual because unlike "kshatriya" widows, Brahmin widows very rarely followed the practice.

==== South India ====
Several sati stones have been found in the Vijayanagara Empire. These stones were erected as a mark of a heroic deed of sacrifice of the wife for her husband and towards the land. The sati stone evidence from the time of the empire is regarded as relatively rare; only about 50 are clearly identified as such. Thus, Carla M. Sinopoli, citing Verghese, says that despite the attention European travellers paid the phenomenon, it should be regarded as having been fairly uncommon during the time of the Vijayanagara Empire.

There were hardly any records of sati in South India prior to 900 CE, but Madurai Nayak dynasty (1529–1736 CE) seems to have adopted the custom in larger measure, one Jesuit priest in 1609 in Madurai observed the burning of 400 women at the death of Nayak Muttu Krishnappa.

The Kongu Nadu region of Tamil Nadu has the highest number of Veera Maha Sati (வீரமாசதி) or Veeramathy temples (வீரமாத்தி) from all the native Kongu castes.

A few records exist from the Princely State of Mysore, established in 1799, that say permission to commit sati could be granted. Dewan (prime minister) Purnaiah is said to have allowed it for a Brahmin widow in 1805, whereas an 1827 eye witness to the burning of a widow in Bangalore in 1827 says it was rather uncommon there.

==== Gangetic plain ====
In the Upper Gangetic plain, while sati occurred, there is no indication that it was especially widespread. The earliest known attempt by a government – the Muslim Sultan Muhammad bin Tughluq – to stop this Hindu practice took place in the Delhi Sultanate in the 14th century.

In the Lower Gangetic plain, sati practice may have reached a high level fairly late in history. According to available evidence and existing reports of occurrences, the greatest incidence of sati in any region and period occurred in Bengal and Bihar in the late 18th and early 19th centuries.

==== Nepal and Bali ====
The earliest stone inscription in the Indian subcontinent relating to sati has been found in Nepal, dating from the 5th century, where the king successfully persuades his mother not to commit sati after his father dies, suggesting that it was practised but was not compulsory. The Kingdom of Nepal formally banned sati in 1920.

On the Indonesian island of Bali, sati (known as masatya) was practised by the aristocracy as late as 1903, until the Dutch colonial authorities pushed for its termination, forcing the local Balinese princes to sign treaties containing the prohibition of sati as one of the clauses. Early Dutch observers of the Balinese custom in the 17th century said that only widows of royal blood were allowed to be burned alive. Concubines or others of inferior blood lines who consented or wanted to die with their princely husband had to be stabbed to death before being burned.

== Terminology ==
Lindsey Harlan, having conducted extensive field work among Rajput women, has constructed a model of how and why women who committed sati are still venerated today, and how the worshippers think about the process involved. Essentially, a woman becomes a sati in three stages:

1. having been a pativrata, or dutiful wife, during her husband's life,
2. making, at her husband's death, a solemn vow to burn by his side, thus gaining status as a sativrata, and
3. having endured being burnt alive, achieving the status of satimata.

=== Pativrata ===
The pativrata is devoted and subservient to her husband, and also protective of him. If he dies before her, some culpability is attached to her for his death, as not having been sufficiently protective of him. Making the vow to burn alive beside him removes her culpability, as well as enabling her to protect him from new dangers in the afterlife.

=== Sativrata ===
In Harlan's model, having made the holy vow to burn herself, the woman becomes a sativrata, existing in a transitional stage between the living and the dead called the Antarabhava before ascending the funeral pyre. Once a woman had committed herself to becoming a sati, popular belief thought her to be endowed with many supernatural powers. Lourens P. Van Den Bosch enumerates some of them: prophecy and clairvoyance, and the ability to bless with sons women who had not borne sons before. Gifts from a sati were venerated as valuable relics, and in her journey to the pyre, people would seek to touch her garments to benefit from her powers.

Lindsey Harlan probes deeper into the sativrata state. As a transitional figure on her path to becoming a powerful family protector as satimata, the sativrata dictates the terms and obligations that the family, in showing reverence to her, must observe in order for her to be able to protect them once she has become satimata. These conditions are generally called ok. A typical example of an ok is a restriction on the colours or types of clothing the family members may wear.

Shrap, or curses, are also within the sativrata's power, associated with remonstrations on members of the family for how they have failed. One woman cursed her in-laws when they brought neither a horse nor a drummer to her pyre, saying that whenever they might need either in the future, (many religious rituals require the presence of such things), it would not be available to them.

=== Satimata ===
After her death on the pyre, the woman is finally transformed into the shape of the satimata, a spiritual embodiment of goodness, her principal concern being a family protector. Typically, the satimata manifests in the dreams of family members, for example, to teach the women how to be good pativratas, having proved herself through her sacrifice that she was the perfect pativrata. However, although the satimata's intentions are always for the good of the family, she is not averse to letting children become sick, or the cows' udders to wither, if she thinks this is an appropriate lesson to the living wife who has neglected her duties as pativrata.

== In scriptures ==
Although it is debated whether it received scriptural mention in early Hinduism, it has been linked to related Hindu practices in regions of India. In the Hindu scriptures, states David Brick, Sati is a wholly voluntary endeavor; it is not portrayed as an obligatory practice, nor does the application of physical coercion serve as a motivating factor in its lawful execution.

In the following, a historical chronology is given of the debate within Hinduism on the topic of sati.

=== The oldest Vedic texts ===
The Vedic Verse 7 itself, unlike verse 8, does not mention widowhood, but the meaning of the syllables yoni (literally "seat, abode") have been rendered as "go up into the dwelling" (by Wilson), as "step into the pyre" (by Kane), as "mount the womb" (by Jamison/Brereton) and as "go up to where he lieth" (by Griffith). A reason given for the discrepancy in translation and interpretation of verse 10.18.7, is that one consonant in a word that meant house, yonim agree ("foremost to the yoni"), was deliberately changed to a word that meant fire, yomiagne, by those who wished to claim scriptural justification.

Dehejia states that Vedic literature has no mention of any practice resembling sati. There is only one mention in the Vedas, of a widow lying down beside her dead husband who is asked to leave the grieving and return to the living, then prayer is offered for a happy life for her with children and wealth. Dehejia writes that this passage does not imply a pre-existing sati custom, nor of widow remarriage, nor that it is authentic verse; its solitary mention may also be explained as an insertion into the text at a latter date. (Note: On this idea of discontuation, see Altekar, Anant S. (1956). The Position of Women in Hindu Civilization: From Prehistoric Times to the Present Day. Delhi: Motilal Banarsidass Pub. p. 118.) Dehejia writes that no ancient or early medieval era Buddhist texts mention sati (since killing/self killing) would have been condemned by them.

Professor David Brick of the University of Michigan, in the paper 'The Dharmasastric Debate on Widow Burning', writes:

There is no mention of sahagamana (sati) whatsoever in either Vedic literature or any of the early Dharmasutras or Dharmasastras. By "early Dharmasutras or Dharmasastras", I refer specifically to both the early Dharmasutras of Apastamba, Hiranyakesin, Gautama, Baudhayana and Vasistha, and the later Dharmasastras of Manu, Narada, and Yajnavalkya.

=== Ancient texts ===
==== Absence in religious texts ====
The Brahmana literature, one of the layers within the ancient Vedic texts, dated about 1000–500 BCE is entirely silent about sati, according to the historian Altekar. Similarly, the Grhyasutras, a body of texts devoted to ritual, composed at about the same time as the most recent Brahmana literature, sati is not mentioned either. What is mentioned concerning funeral rites, is that the widow is to be brought back from her husband's funeral pyre, either by his brother, or by a trusted servant. In the Taittiriya Aranyaka from about the same time, it is said that when leaving, the widow takes from her husband's side such objects as his bow, gold and jewels, and hope is expressed that the widow and her relatives lead a happy and prosperous life afterwards. According to Altekar, it is "clear" that the custom of actual widow burning had died out a long time previously.

Nor is the practice of sati mentioned anywhere in the Dharmasutras, texts tentatively dated by Pandurang Vaman Kane to 600–100 BCE, while Patrick Olivelle thinks the parameters should be roughly 250–100 BCE.

Not only is sati not mentioned in Brahmana and early Dharmasastra literature, Satapatha Brahmana explains that suicide/self-murder by anyone is immoral (adharmaic). This Śruti prohibition became one of the several bases for arguments presented against sati by 11th- to 14th-century Hindu scholars such as Medhatithi of Kashmir,

Therefore, one should not depart before one's natural lifespan.

— Śatapatha Brāhmaṇa, 10.2.6.7

Thus, in none of the principal religious texts believed to be composed before the Common Era is there any evidence for the sanctioning of the practice of sati; it is wholly unmentioned. However, the archaic Atharvaveda does contain hints of a funeral practice of symbolic sati. Also, in the twelfth-century CE commentary of Apararka, claiming to quote the Dharmasutra text Apastamba, it says that if a widow has made a vow of burning herself (anvahorana, "ascend the pyre"), but then retracts her vow, she must expiate her sin by the penance ritual called Prajapatya-vrata

==== Valmiki Ramayana ====
The oldest portion of the epic Ramayana, the Valmiki Ramayana, is tentatively dated for its composition by Robert P. Goldman to 750–500 BCE. Anant S. Altekar says that no instances of sati occur in this earliest part of the Ramayana.

According to Ramashraya Sharma, there is no conclusive evidence of the sati practice in the Ramayana. For instance, Tara, Mandodari and the widows of Ravana, all live after their respective husband's deaths, though all of them announce their wish to die, while lamenting for their husbands. The first two remarry their brother-in-law. He also mentions that though Dashratha, father of Rama, died soon after his departure from the city, his mothers survived and received him after the completion of his exile. The only instance of sati appears in the Uttara Kanda – believed to be a later addition to the original text – in which Kushadhwaja's wife performs sati. The Telugu adaptation of the Ramayana, the 14th-century Ranganatha Ramayana, tells that Sulochana, wife of Indrajit, became sati on his funeral pyre.

==== Mahabharata ====
Instances of sati are found in the Mahabharata, though these instances are also considered as later interpolations by some scholars.

Madri, the second wife of Pandu, immolates herself. She believes she is responsible for his death, as he had been cursed with death if he ever had intercourse. He died while performing the forbidden act with Madri; she blamed herself for not rejecting him, as she knew of the curse. Also, in the case of Madri the entire assembly of rishis (sages) sought to dissuade her from the act, and no religious merit is attached to the fate she chooses against all advice. However, this account is contradicted by the very next stanza found in all versions of the Mahabharata, which states that her dead body and that of her husband were handed over by sages to the Kaurava elders in Hastinapura for the funeral rites. Pandu's first wife Kunti lived with her sons for many years and withdrew to the forest with Dhritarashtra and Gandhari after the war. In the Mausala-parvan of the Mahabharata, the four wives of Vasudeva are said to commit sati. Furthermore, as news of Krishna's death reaches Hastinapur, five of his wives ascended the funeral pyre, while others embrace ascetism.

Against these stray examples within the Mahabharata of sati, there are scores of instances in the same epic of widows who do not commit sati, and none are blamed for not doing so.

=== Hindu Puranas ===
In Brahma Purana, it is said to be the "highest duty of the woman to immolate herself after her husband".

=== Hindu Smritis ===
There is no allusion to the custom in Kautilya's Arthashastra and the Smritis.

The Manusmriti, in fact, emphasized women as "pujarha grhadiptayah" (worthy of respect), as they are the light that illuminates the household. Manu stated that a virtuous wife, who remains chaste even after her husband's death, reaches heaven, just like chaste men.

Daksa Smriti narrates the story of a woman experiencing eternal bliss in heaven by dying alongside her husband on his funeral pyre. The Agni Purana discusses the ability of widows to self-restrain and immolate themselves, allowing them to enter heaven.

Yajnavalkya asserts that sati is the sole path for a chaste widow. A widow who devoted her life to her husband's death spends as much time in svarga (heaven) as the hairs on a human body. Vishnu Smriti presents a dilemma: either live a life of chastity or sacrifice one's husband's pyre.

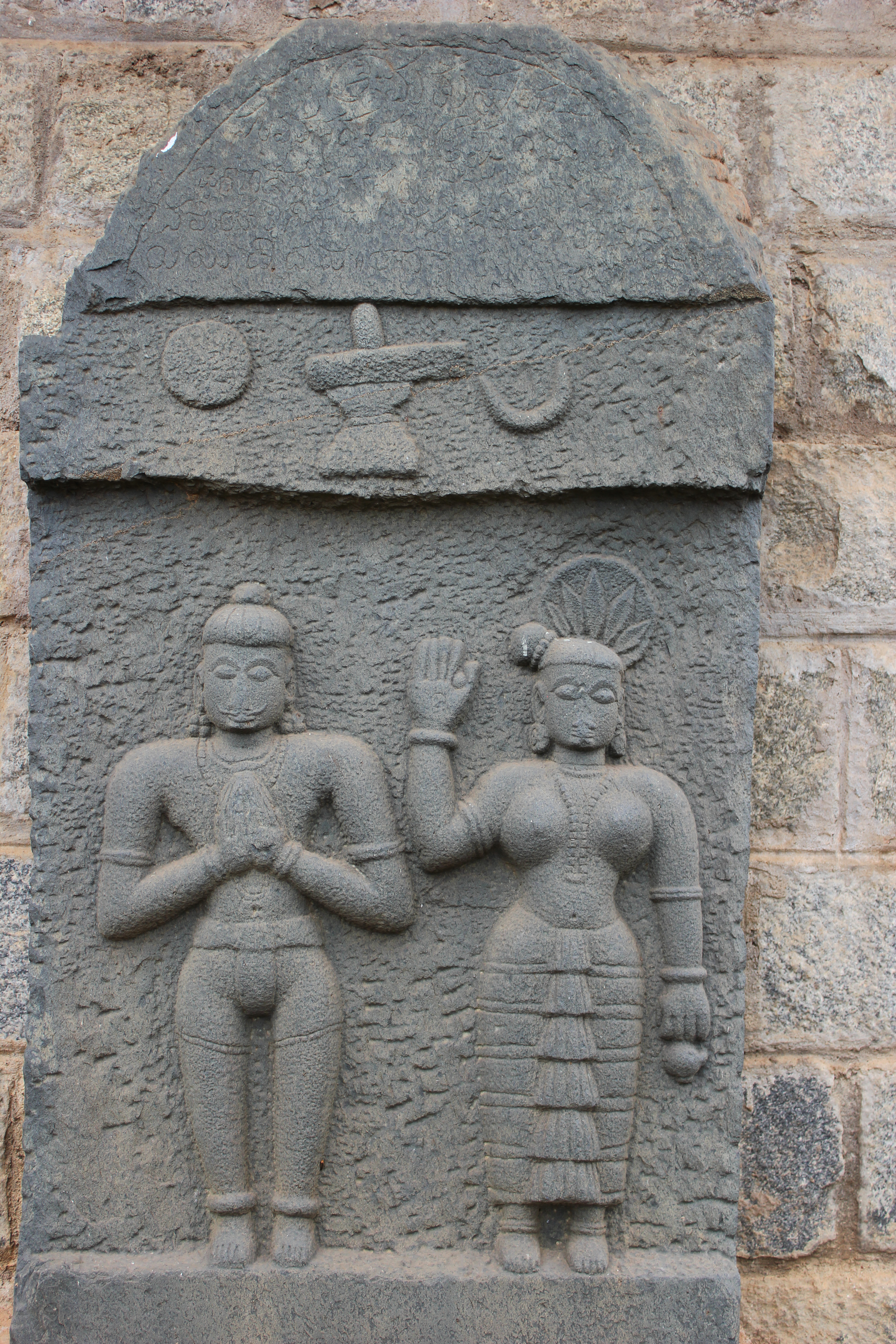
Satigal (sati stone) near Kedareshvara Temple, Balligavi, Karnataka

A passage of the Parasara Smriti says:

If a woman adheres to a vow of ascetic celibacy (brahmacarya) after her husband has died, then when she dies, she obtains heaven, just like those who were celibate. Further, three and a half krores or however many hairs are on a human body – for that long a time (in years) a woman who follows her husband (in death) shall dwell in heaven.

— Parasara Smriti, 4.29–31

Neither of these suggest that sati as mandatory, but the Parasara Smriti elaborates the benefits of sati in greater detail.

Within the dharmashastric tradition espousing sati as a justified or even recommended option to ascetic widowhood, there remains a curious conception worth noting - the after-death status of a woman committing sati. Burning herself on the pyre would give her and her husband, automatic, but not eternal, reception into heaven (svarga), whereas only the wholly chaste widow living out her natural lifespan could hope for final liberation (moksha) and the breaking the cycle of saṃsāric rebirth.

While some smriti passages allow sati as optional, others forbid the practice entirely. Vijñāneśvara (c. 1076–1127), an early Dharmaśāstric scholar, claims that many smriti call for the prohibition of sati among Brahmin widows, but not among other social castes. Vijñāneśvara, quoting scriptures from Paithinasi and Angiras to support his argument, states:

Due to Vedic injunction, a Brahmin woman should not follow her husband in death, but for the other social classes, tradition holds this to be the supreme Law of Women... when a woman of Brahmin caste follows her husband in death, by killing herself she leaders neither herself nor her husband to heaven.

However, as proof of the contradictory opinion of the smriti on sati, in his Mitākṣarā, Vijñāneśvara argues Brahmin women are technically only forbidden from performing sati on pyres other than those of their deceased husbands. Quoting the Yājñavalkya Smṛti, Vijñāneśvara states, "a Brahmin woman ought not to depart by ascending a separate pyre." David Brick states that the Brahmin sati commentary suggests that the practice may have originated in the warrior and ruling class of medieval Indian society. In addition to providing arguments in support of sati, Vijñāneśvara offers arguments against the ritual.

However, those who supported the ritual did put restrictions on sati. It was considered wrong for women who had young children to care for and those who were pregnant or menstruating. A woman who had doubts or did not wish to commit sati at the last moment could be removed from the pyre by a man, usually a brother of the deceased or someone from her husband's side of the family.

David Brick, summarizing the historical evolution of scholarly debate on sati in Medieval India, states:

To summarize, one can loosely arrange Dharmasastic writings on sahagamana into three historical periods. In the first of these, which roughly corresponds to the second half of the 1st millennium CE, smrti texts that prescribe sahagamana begin to appear. However, during approximately this same period, other Brahmanical authors also compose a number of smrtis that proscribe this practice specifically in the case of Brahmin widows. Moreover, Medhatithi – our earliest commentator to address the issue – strongly opposes the practice for all women. Taken together, this textual evidence suggests that sahagamana was still quite controversial at this time. In the following period, opposition to this custom starts to weaken, as none of the later commentators fully endorses Medhatithi's position on sahagamana. Indeed, after Vijnanesvara in the early twelfth century, the strongest position taken against sahagamana appears to be that it is an inferior option to brahmacarya (ascetic celibacy), since its result is only heaven rather than moksa (liberation). Finally, in the third period, several commentators refute even this attenuated objection to sahagamana, for they cite a previously unquoted smrti passage that specifically lists liberation as a result of the rite's performance. They thereby claim that sahagamana is at least as beneficial an option for widows as brahmacarya and perhaps even more so, given the special praise it sometimes receives. These authors, however, consistently stop short of making it an obligatory act. Hence, the commentarial literature of the dharma tradition attests to a gradual shift from strict prohibition to complete endorsement in its attitude toward sahagamana.

=== Sanskrit literatures ===
The earliest scholarly discussion of sati is found in Sanskrit literature dated to 10th- to 12th-century. The earliest known commentary on sati by Medhatithi of Kashmir argues that it is a form of suicide, which is prohibited by the Vedic tradition. Vijnanesvara, of the 12th-century Chalukya court, and the 13th-century Madhavacharya, argue that sati should not to be considered suicide, which was otherwise variously banned or discouraged in the scriptures. They offer a combination of reasons, both in for and against sati.

=== Justifications for involuntary sati ===
Julia Leslie points to Strī-dharma-paddhati, an 18th-century CE text on the duties of the wife by Tryambakayajvan that contains statements she regards as evidence for a sub-tradition that justifies strongly encouraged, pressured, or even forced sati; however the standard view of sati within the justifying tradition is that of the woman who out of moral heroism chooses sati, rather than choosing to enter ascetic widowhood. (Note: And thus, critically, sati regarded as an essentially voluntary act, the woman afterwards worthy of worship.) Tryambaka is quite clear upon the automatic good effect of sati for the woman who was a 'bad' wife:

Women who, due to their wicked minds, have always despised their husbands [...] whether they do this (i.e., sati), of their own free will, or out of anger, or even out of fear – all of them are purified from sin.

(Note: For direct quotation, see p.56, for rest of discussion, consult essay Leslie (1993, p. 45))

Thus, as Leslie puts it, becoming (or being pressured into the role of) a sati was, within Tryambaka's thinking, the only truly effective method of atonement for the bad wife.

=== Exegesis scholarship against sati ===
Opposition to sati was expressed by several exegesis scholars: the 9th or 10th-century Kashmiri scholar Medhātithi – who offers the earliest known explicit discussion of sati, the 12th to 17th-century scholars Vijnanesvara, Apararka and Devanadhatta, as well as the mystical Tantric tradition, with its valorisation of the feminine principle.

Explicit criticisms were published by Medhatithi, a commentator on various theological works. He offered two arguments for his opposition. He considered sati a form of suicide, which was forbidden by the Vedas: "One shall not die before the span of one's life is run out." Medhatithi offered a second reason against sati, calling it against dharma (adharma). He argued that there is a general prohibition against violence of any form against living beings, especially killing, in the Vedic dharma tradition. Sati causes death, which is self-violence; thus sati is against Vedic teachings.

Vijnanesvara presents both sides of the argument for and against sati. First, he argues that Vedas do not prohibit self-sacrifice aimed to stop an enemy, or in pursuit of heaven; thus sati for these reasons is not prohibited. Then he presents two arguments against sati, calling it "objectionable". The first is based on hymn 10.2.6.7 of Satapatha Brahmana which forbids suicide. His second reason against sati is an appeal to the relative merit between two choices. Death may grant a woman's wish to enter heaven with her dead husband, but living offers her the possibility of reaching moksha through knowledge of the self through learning, reflecting and meditating. In Vedic tradition, moksha is of higher merit than heaven, because moksha leads to eternal, unsurpassed bliss while heaven is impermanent, thus a smaller happiness. Living gives a widow the option to discover a deeper and totally fulfilling happiness than dying through sati does.

Apararka acknowledges that Vedic scripture prohibits violence against living beings and "one should not kill", however, he argues that this rule prohibits violence against another person, but does not prohibit killing oneself. Thus sati is a woman's choice and it is not prohibited by Vedic tradition.

== In culture ==
European artists in the eighteenth century produced many images for their own native markets, showing widows as heroic women and moral exemplars.

In Jules Verne's novel Around the World in Eighty Days, Phileas Fogg rescues Princess Aouda from forced sati.

In M. M. Kaye's epic novel of British-Indian The Far Pavilions the hero Ash rescues his love interest princess Anjuli from sati after the death of her husband, the Rana of Bhithor.

In her article "Can the Subaltern Speak?", Indian philosopher Gayatri Spivak discussed the history of sati during the colonial era and how the practise took the form of trapping women in India in a double bind of either self-expression attributed to mental illness and social rejection, or of self-incrimination according to colonial legislation. The woman who commits sati takes the form of the subaltern in Spivak's work, a form that much of postcolonial studies take very seriously.

The 2005 novel The Ashram by Indian writer Sattar Memon, deals with the plight of an oppressed young woman in India, under pressure to commit sati and the endeavours of a western spiritual aspirant to save her.

In Krishna Dharabasi's Nepali novel Jhola, a young widow narrowly escapes self immolation. The novel was later adapted into a movie titled after the book.

Rudyard Kipling's poem The Last Suttee (1889) recounts how the widowed queen of a Rajput king disguised herself as a nautch girl in order to pass through a line of guards and die upon his pyre.

Amitav Ghosh's Sea of Poppies represents the practice of sati in Ghazipur city in the state of Uttar Pradesh with one of the main characters, 'Deeti', escaping the sati that her family and relatives were trying to force her to do after the death of her husband.

== See also ==
- Deorala
- Jauhar
- Ritual suicide
- Self-immolation
- Thalaikoothal
- Witch-hunt
- Dola pratha

== Sources ==
- Brick, David (2010). "The Dharmasastric Debate on Widow Burning". Journal of the American Oriental Society. 130 (2): 203–223. JSTOR 23044515.
- Bosworth, A.B. (2005). The Legacy of Alexander: Politics, Warfare, and Propaganda under the Successors. Oxford University Press. ISBN 9780198153061.
- Cain, Peter J.; Harrison, Mark (2001). Imperialism: Critical Concepts in Historical Studies. Routledge. ISBN 978-0-415-20630-3.
- Dehejia, Vidya (1994). "Comment: A Broader Landscape". In Hawley, John Stratton (ed.). Sati, the Blessing and the Curse. Oxford University Press. ISBN 978-0-19-507774-2.
- Dodwell, H. H (1932). The Cambridge History of the British Empire. CUP Archive.
- Doniger, Wendy (2009). The Hindus: An Alternative History. Penguin Books. p. 611. ISBN 978-0-14-311669-1.
- Kuzmina, Elena Efimovna (2007). J.P. Mallory (ed.). The Origin of the Indo-Iranians. Leyden: Brill. ISBN 978-90-04-16054-5.
- Leslie, Julia (1993). "Suttee or Sati: Victim or Victor?". In Arnold, David; Robb, Peter (eds.). Institutions and Ideologies: A SOAS South Asia Reader. Vol. 10. London: Routledge. p. 46. ISBN 978-0-7007-0284-8.
- Mani, L. (1987). Contentious traditions: the debate on sati in colonial India. Cultural Critique, (7), 119–156.
- Mani, L. (1998). Contentious traditions: The debate on sati in colonial India. University of California Press.
- Meenakshi Jain (2016). Sati: Evangelicals, Baptist Missionaries, and the Changing Colonial Discourse, Aryan Books International. ISBN 978-8173055522
- Oldenburg, Veena Talwar (1994). "Comment: The Continuing Invention of the Sati Tradition". In Hawley, John Stratton (ed.). Sati, the Blessing and the Curse. Oxford University Press. ISBN 978-0-19-507774-2.
- Sangari, K., & Vaid, S. (1981). Sati in Modern India: a report. Economic and Political Weekly, 1284–1288.
- Sharma, Arvind (2001). Sati: Historical and Phenomenological Essays. Motilal Banarsidass. ISBN 978-81-208-0464-7.
- Stein, Burton (4 February 2010). A History of India. John Wiley & Sons. ISBN 978-1-4443-2351-1.
- Thapar, Romila (2002). The Penguin History of Early India. From the Origins to AD 1300. Penguin.
- Yang, Anand A. (2008). "Whose Sati? Widow-Burning in early Nineteenth Century India". In Sarkar, Sumit; Sarkar, Tanika (eds.). Women and Social Reform in Modern India: A Reader. Bloomington, Ind.: Indiana University Press. ISBN 978-0-253-35269-9.
- Zechenter, E. M. (1997). In the name of culture: Cultural relativism and the abuse of the individual. Journal of Anthropological Research, 319–347.
