= Roop Kanwar =

Indian victim of Sati

Roopkuvarba Kanwar
- Born: c. 1969
- Died: 4 September 1987 (aged 18); Deorala, Sikar district, Rajasthan, India
- Known for: Sati
- Spouse: Maal Singh

Roopkoonvar Kanwar (c. 1969 – 4 September 1987) was a teenage Rajput widow in India who was burned on her husband's funeral pyre in an act of Sati at Deorala village in Rajasthan, India. At the time, she was 18 years old and had been married for eight months to Maal Singh Shekhawat, who had died a day earlier at the age of 24. They had no children. The crowd which witnessed her death approved of the act and regarded it as entirely voluntary. Her death prompted public debate in India over the practice of Sati. Roop Kanwar's death led to changes in both state and national laws to prevent sati. 45 people were charged in relation to her death, by 2024, all had been acquitted.

== Death ==
On 4 September 1987 Roop Kanwar was burnt alive on the funeral pyre of her husband. Several thousand people attended. After her death, Roop Kanwar was hailed as a sati mata – a sati mother, or pure mother. The death quickly produced a public outcry across various parts of the country. It led first to state level laws to prevent the practice and glorification of sati, then the central government's Commission of Sati (Prevention) Act in 1988, and banning, for the first time, also the glorification of the practice.

=== News reports ===
The incident came to the notice of authorities following a shortage of coconuts. The villagers glorified the sati and started offering coconuts to her at her place of death; this caused a shortage which raised a red flag to revenue officials.

Initial official records and eyewitness accounts provided by friends, family and villagers claimed that Roop Kanwar's act of sati was a voluntary choice. Some news reports claim Kanwar was forced to her death by other attendees present.

=== Charge sheet ===
The original inquiries resulted in 45 people being charged with her death. As of 2019, 25 of these people were acquitted in November 2004, six are no longer alive, five were declared as absconders and nine were facing trial. A much-publicised later investigation led to the arrest of a large number of people from Deorala, said to have been present in the ceremony including Roop’s father-in-law Sumer Singh, and three other relatives on charges of murder and abetting suicide.

Eventually, 11 people, including state politicians, were charged with glorification of sati. On 31 January 2004 a special court in Jaipur acquitted all of the 11 accused in the case. On 10 October 2024, the remaining 8 people were acquitted.
