= Deorala =

Coordinates: 27°24′N 75°46′E

Divrala Deorala
- village
- Nickname: Deorala
- Interactive map of Divrala
- Country: India
- State: Rajasthan
- District: Sikar

Languages
  - Official: Hindi
  - Un Official: Shekhawati
- Time zone: UTC+5:30 (IST)
- ISO 3166 code: RJ-IN
- Vehicle registration: RJ 23
- Nearest city: Ajitgargh, Sri Madhopur, (Neem ka thana)

Divrala is a village in the Sikar district of Rajasthan, India.

Divrala is a village in the Shekhawati region. It is located near Amarsar which was the capital of Maharao Shekhaji, precursor of all Shekhawat rajputs. It is also called Deorala and Divrala.

It became infamous because of the Sati incident that took place on 4 September 1987.

== Sati ==
The victim of the Sati incident was of an educated 18-year-old woman named Roop Kanwar, who was a resident of the village and whose husband, Mal Singh Shekhawat, had died of disease the previous day. While many details remain unclear, many claim that she took the decision to follow the ancient custom and died on the funeral pyre of her husband, while the general feeling is that she was forced by the villagers onto the pyre, perhaps after having been given some sedatives.

After she had burnt to death, the place was converted into a memorial and thousands of people from surrounding regions started visiting it, though afterwards the area was sealed in order not to promote sati as a legitimate action, and to prevent similar incidents happening in the future.

Although family members and others were arrested following this incident, they were acquitted. Many are not fully satisfied with the judgement. Women's organizations pressurized the government to reopen the case

== Positive developments ==
Publications such as Outlook Magazine have highlighted positive developments from the village, such as election of a woman sarpanch to highlight the change in people's perception of women's place in the society

== Population ==
The village population is over 14,000.
