= Ashram (disambiguation) =

Ashram is a Hindu hermitage or retreat, typically for spiritual instruction and meditation.

Ashram may also refer to:

- Ashram, or Ashrama (stage), one of four age-based life stages in Hinduism
- Ashramavasika Parva, fifteenth book of the ancient Indian epic Mahabharata
- Linoy Ashram (born 1999), Israeli individual rhythmic gymnast
- Ashram (Balmiki), the main site of worship in the Balmiki faith

== Arts and entertainment ==
- Ashram (band), an Italian band
- The Ashram (novel), a 2005 novel by Sattar Memon
- The Ashram (film), a 2018 Indian-American film by Ben Rekhi
- Aashram, a 2020 Hindi-language crime drama web series

== See also ==
- Ashrama, California, an unincorporated community in Santa Clara County
