= Sattar Memon =

Indian doctor and author (born 1947)

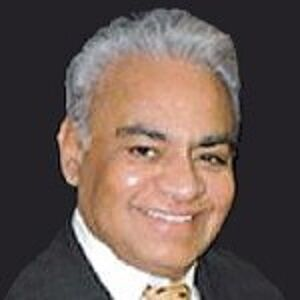
- Born: 1947 (age 78–79); Northwestern, India
- Occupations: Doctor; literary and medical author
- Writing career
- Genres: Spiritual fiction; medical
- Website: www.ashrambooks.com

Sattar Memon (born 1947) is an Indian doctor and author. He has been an Associate Professor of Medicine emeritus at Brown University in Providence, Rhode Island, US since 1996, holds a medical degree and is a fellow of the American College of Physicians. He has published six books. The film rights were acquired in 2008 for his first novel, The Ashram.

== Published works ==
- The Providence Journal magazine section – fiction: Manohar: He had made it in America. Then this immigrant from India got a letter from a childhood friend (1987);
- The Ashram (2005);
- Jews, Christians, Hindus, and Muslims: Tell Them the Truth: There Are No Angels... No Miracles. And... There Is No God! (2007). An anthology of spiritually based short stories tales of faith.
- Breast Cancer Breakthroughs: Living Longer (2010);
- Curing Breast Cancer Blues: 150 Latest & Illustrated Questions & Answers (2012);
- Send Me an Angel: Overcoming Cancer with Faith, Medicine & Miracles (2012).
- Soul’s Fury - a novel about an antisemitic young Muslim who wants blow himself up inside the Wall Street to kill all — has a change of heart & ends up saving the very people he wanted to hurt: an antidote toward hatred for Jews.

== Philanthropy ==
The proceeds from the sale of Breast Cancer Breakthroughs were divided among three charities: Gloria Gemma Breast Cancer Foundation, Crossroads Homeless Shelter, and Providence Public Library.

== Awards ==
Honors, Awards, Achievements:

- Board Certified in Internal Medicine and Medical Oncology
- Clinical A. Professor of Medicine, Emeritus, Brown University.
- Clinical Medical Oncology Practice Experience :Twenty plus years
- Administrative / Directorial Experience
- 26 scientific articles published
- Principal Investigator of eight Clinical Trials
- 107 scientific presentations to Laity / Medical community
- “Life Saver Award,”(elected by Rhode Island Physicians): American Cancer Society
- “Distinguished Teacher of the Last Twenty Years" award, by Brown University
- Best teacher of the year award (2024) by R.I. Free Clinic
- Medical licenses: RI, MA, FL
- Award for outstanding services as Rhode Island Cancer Society's Division's Crusade leader.
- The Ashram (Spiritual Hermitage, in Sanskrit), won a top award in the Inspirational Category of the 13th Annual Writer's Digest International Self-Published Book Awards (2005). The Ashram novel also won a top award in Female Empowerment Category contest by International Impact Book Award
