= The Ashram (novel) =

2005 novel by Sattar Memon

- Author: Sattar Memon
- Language: English
- Genre: Novel
- Publisher: Iuniverse Inc
- Publication date: April 2005
- Publication place: India
- Media type: Print (Paperback & Hardback)
- ISBN: 0-595-09406-6
- Website: http://www.ashrambooks.com

The Ashram is a 2005 novel by Indian writer Sattar Memon, about the plight of an oppressed young woman in India.

== Plot summary ==
Jonathan Kingsley tries to save himself from suicidal thoughts after the death of his wife by travelling to a Himalayan spiritual hermitage, known as an Ashram, to provide him peace through volunteer work.

As the doctor searches for an excuse to keep on living, Seeta struggles to keep her own husband alive, both out of love and for her own safety. The townspeople of Baramedi, bowing to the wishes of a local landowner (nicknamed Satan), have decided that when her husband dies, Seeta should climb onto a burning pyre to burn with his body. This practice of suttee, out of use for many years, brings Jonathan to her town in an effort to save her, but when he arrives at the pyre, he realizes there is more to his journey, and that the woman's safety is intricately tied with his own spiritual salvation.

== Awards and nominations ==
The Ashram won a top prize in the Writer's Digest International (2005) Self-Published Book Awards, in the "inspirational books" category.

The Ashram also won third place in the Pen/Nob Hill Soulmaking Contest.

Movie rights to the book were acquired in 2008.

== See also ==
- Ashram
