= Kadianwali =

- Village
- Location in Punjab, India Kadianwali (India)
- Coordinates: 31.2484702°N 75.5754983°E
- Country: India
- State: Punjab
- District: Jalandhar

Government
  - Type: Panchayat raj
  - Body: Gram panchayat
- Elevation: 240 m (790 ft)

Languages
  - Official: Punjabi
- Time zone: UTC+5:30 (IST)
- ISO 3166 code: IN-PB
- Vehicle registration: PB- 08
- Website: jalandhar.nic.in

Kadianwali is a village in the Jalandhar district of Punjab State, India. It is located 9 kilometres (5.6 mi) from the district headquarters Jalandhar and 152 kilometres (94 mi) from the state capital Chandigarh. The village is administrated by a Sarpanch who is an elected representative of the village.

== See also ==
- Dhanal
- List of villages in India
